

267001–267100 

|-bgcolor=#E9E9E9
| 267001 || 1094 T-3 || — || October 17, 1977 || Palomar || PLS || — || align=right | 3.7 km || 
|-id=002 bgcolor=#fefefe
| 267002 || 3807 T-3 || — || October 16, 1977 || Palomar || PLS || — || align=right | 1.2 km || 
|-id=003 bgcolor=#d6d6d6
| 267003 Burkert || 1978 PF ||  || August 10, 1978 || La Silla || L. D. Schmadel || EUP || align=right | 4.0 km || 
|-id=004 bgcolor=#FA8072
| 267004 || 1981 UA || — || October 21, 1981 || Palomar || R. S. Dunbar || — || align=right | 1.8 km || 
|-id=005 bgcolor=#E9E9E9
| 267005 ||  || — || September 2, 1992 || La Silla || E. W. Elst || — || align=right | 1.6 km || 
|-id=006 bgcolor=#fefefe
| 267006 ||  || — || January 22, 1993 || Kitt Peak || Spacewatch || — || align=right data-sort-value="0.90" | 900 m || 
|-id=007 bgcolor=#E9E9E9
| 267007 ||  || — || March 17, 1993 || La Silla || UESAC || — || align=right | 2.4 km || 
|-id=008 bgcolor=#fefefe
| 267008 ||  || — || March 19, 1993 || La Silla || UESAC || NYS || align=right data-sort-value="0.84" | 840 m || 
|-id=009 bgcolor=#E9E9E9
| 267009 ||  || — || October 9, 1993 || Kitt Peak || Spacewatch || — || align=right | 1.1 km || 
|-id=010 bgcolor=#E9E9E9
| 267010 ||  || — || February 11, 1994 || Kitt Peak || Spacewatch || — || align=right | 1.2 km || 
|-id=011 bgcolor=#fefefe
| 267011 ||  || — || August 12, 1994 || La Silla || E. W. Elst || — || align=right | 1.2 km || 
|-id=012 bgcolor=#fefefe
| 267012 ||  || — || September 3, 1994 || La Silla || E. W. Elst || — || align=right data-sort-value="0.98" | 980 m || 
|-id=013 bgcolor=#E9E9E9
| 267013 ||  || — || September 18, 1995 || Kitt Peak || Spacewatch || — || align=right | 2.2 km || 
|-id=014 bgcolor=#fefefe
| 267014 ||  || — || September 25, 1995 || Kitt Peak || Spacewatch || — || align=right data-sort-value="0.89" | 890 m || 
|-id=015 bgcolor=#d6d6d6
| 267015 ||  || — || September 25, 1995 || Kitt Peak || Spacewatch || SYL7:4 || align=right | 4.7 km || 
|-id=016 bgcolor=#fefefe
| 267016 ||  || — || September 26, 1995 || Kitt Peak || Spacewatch || FLO || align=right data-sort-value="0.76" | 760 m || 
|-id=017 bgcolor=#fefefe
| 267017 Yangzhifa || 1995 UA ||  || October 16, 1995 || Colleverde || V. S. Casulli || NYS || align=right data-sort-value="0.73" | 730 m || 
|-id=018 bgcolor=#fefefe
| 267018 ||  || — || October 24, 1995 || Kleť || Kleť Obs. || V || align=right data-sort-value="0.86" | 860 m || 
|-id=019 bgcolor=#fefefe
| 267019 ||  || — || November 14, 1995 || Kitt Peak || Spacewatch || — || align=right | 1.0 km || 
|-id=020 bgcolor=#fefefe
| 267020 ||  || — || November 15, 1995 || Kitt Peak || Spacewatch || NYS || align=right data-sort-value="0.66" | 660 m || 
|-id=021 bgcolor=#fefefe
| 267021 ||  || — || November 15, 1995 || Kitt Peak || Spacewatch || — || align=right | 1.1 km || 
|-id=022 bgcolor=#E9E9E9
| 267022 ||  || — || November 17, 1995 || Kitt Peak || Spacewatch || CLO || align=right | 3.5 km || 
|-id=023 bgcolor=#fefefe
| 267023 ||  || — || November 19, 1995 || Kitt Peak || Spacewatch || — || align=right | 1.0 km || 
|-id=024 bgcolor=#fefefe
| 267024 ||  || — || December 14, 1995 || Kitt Peak || Spacewatch || — || align=right | 1.2 km || 
|-id=025 bgcolor=#d6d6d6
| 267025 ||  || — || December 14, 1995 || Kitt Peak || Spacewatch || — || align=right | 3.2 km || 
|-id=026 bgcolor=#fefefe
| 267026 ||  || — || March 11, 1996 || Kitt Peak || Spacewatch || MAS || align=right data-sort-value="0.90" | 900 m || 
|-id=027 bgcolor=#d6d6d6
| 267027 ||  || — || September 6, 1996 || Kitt Peak || Spacewatch || — || align=right | 4.8 km || 
|-id=028 bgcolor=#d6d6d6
| 267028 ||  || — || September 15, 1996 || Kitt Peak || Spacewatch || — || align=right | 3.6 km || 
|-id=029 bgcolor=#fefefe
| 267029 ||  || — || October 7, 1996 || Kitt Peak || Spacewatch || — || align=right data-sort-value="0.86" | 860 m || 
|-id=030 bgcolor=#E9E9E9
| 267030 ||  || — || October 8, 1996 || La Silla || E. W. Elst || — || align=right | 1.6 km || 
|-id=031 bgcolor=#fefefe
| 267031 ||  || — || October 5, 1996 || La Silla || E. W. Elst || — || align=right data-sort-value="0.90" | 900 m || 
|-id=032 bgcolor=#E9E9E9
| 267032 ||  || — || October 3, 1996 || La Silla || E. W. Elst || — || align=right | 2.0 km || 
|-id=033 bgcolor=#E9E9E9
| 267033 ||  || — || November 9, 1996 || Kitt Peak || Spacewatch || WIT || align=right | 1.2 km || 
|-id=034 bgcolor=#E9E9E9
| 267034 ||  || — || January 12, 1997 || Caussols || ODAS || — || align=right | 3.3 km || 
|-id=035 bgcolor=#fefefe
| 267035 ||  || — || March 3, 1997 || Kitt Peak || Spacewatch || — || align=right data-sort-value="0.93" | 930 m || 
|-id=036 bgcolor=#fefefe
| 267036 ||  || — || September 27, 1997 || Rand || G. R. Viscome || — || align=right data-sort-value="0.97" | 970 m || 
|-id=037 bgcolor=#E9E9E9
| 267037 || 1997 YG || — || December 18, 1997 || Oizumi || T. Kobayashi || — || align=right | 1.4 km || 
|-id=038 bgcolor=#E9E9E9
| 267038 ||  || — || December 21, 1997 || Oizumi || T. Kobayashi || — || align=right | 1.5 km || 
|-id=039 bgcolor=#fefefe
| 267039 ||  || — || February 23, 1998 || Kitt Peak || Spacewatch || FLO || align=right data-sort-value="0.76" | 760 m || 
|-id=040 bgcolor=#E9E9E9
| 267040 || 1998 FW || — || March 18, 1998 || Kitt Peak || Spacewatch || — || align=right | 1.8 km || 
|-id=041 bgcolor=#E9E9E9
| 267041 ||  || — || March 29, 1998 || Socorro || LINEAR || JUN || align=right | 1.4 km || 
|-id=042 bgcolor=#E9E9E9
| 267042 ||  || — || April 2, 1998 || Socorro || LINEAR || MIT || align=right | 4.4 km || 
|-id=043 bgcolor=#E9E9E9
| 267043 ||  || — || April 17, 1998 || Kitt Peak || Spacewatch || — || align=right | 2.8 km || 
|-id=044 bgcolor=#E9E9E9
| 267044 ||  || — || April 23, 1998 || Socorro || LINEAR || JUN || align=right | 1.4 km || 
|-id=045 bgcolor=#fefefe
| 267045 ||  || — || August 17, 1998 || Socorro || LINEAR || KLI || align=right | 2.4 km || 
|-id=046 bgcolor=#FA8072
| 267046 ||  || — || September 14, 1998 || Socorro || LINEAR || — || align=right | 1.1 km || 
|-id=047 bgcolor=#fefefe
| 267047 ||  || — || September 14, 1998 || Socorro || LINEAR || FLO || align=right | 1.1 km || 
|-id=048 bgcolor=#fefefe
| 267048 ||  || — || September 14, 1998 || Socorro || LINEAR || — || align=right data-sort-value="0.94" | 940 m || 
|-id=049 bgcolor=#d6d6d6
| 267049 ||  || — || September 14, 1998 || Socorro || LINEAR || — || align=right | 2.5 km || 
|-id=050 bgcolor=#d6d6d6
| 267050 ||  || — || September 17, 1998 || Caussols || ODAS || EOS || align=right | 2.9 km || 
|-id=051 bgcolor=#d6d6d6
| 267051 ||  || — || September 20, 1998 || Xinglong || SCAP || — || align=right | 3.6 km || 
|-id=052 bgcolor=#fefefe
| 267052 ||  || — || September 26, 1998 || Socorro || LINEAR || NYS || align=right data-sort-value="0.83" | 830 m || 
|-id=053 bgcolor=#d6d6d6
| 267053 ||  || — || September 26, 1998 || Socorro || LINEAR || — || align=right | 4.7 km || 
|-id=054 bgcolor=#fefefe
| 267054 ||  || — || September 26, 1998 || Socorro || LINEAR || NYS || align=right data-sort-value="0.94" | 940 m || 
|-id=055 bgcolor=#d6d6d6
| 267055 ||  || — || September 26, 1998 || Socorro || LINEAR || — || align=right | 4.2 km || 
|-id=056 bgcolor=#d6d6d6
| 267056 ||  || — || October 28, 1998 || Socorro || LINEAR || — || align=right | 6.3 km || 
|-id=057 bgcolor=#fefefe
| 267057 ||  || — || November 14, 1998 || Kitt Peak || Spacewatch || NYS || align=right data-sort-value="0.85" | 850 m || 
|-id=058 bgcolor=#d6d6d6
| 267058 ||  || — || November 15, 1998 || Kitt Peak || Spacewatch || THM || align=right | 3.3 km || 
|-id=059 bgcolor=#d6d6d6
| 267059 ||  || — || November 16, 1998 || Kitt Peak || Spacewatch || — || align=right | 4.8 km || 
|-id=060 bgcolor=#fefefe
| 267060 ||  || — || November 19, 1998 || Caussols || ODAS || — || align=right | 1.2 km || 
|-id=061 bgcolor=#E9E9E9
| 267061 ||  || — || November 19, 1998 || Caussols || ODAS || — || align=right data-sort-value="0.89" | 890 m || 
|-id=062 bgcolor=#d6d6d6
| 267062 ||  || — || December 20, 1998 || Catalina || CSS || EUP || align=right | 6.5 km || 
|-id=063 bgcolor=#E9E9E9
| 267063 ||  || — || March 20, 1999 || Apache Point || SDSS || — || align=right | 1.3 km || 
|-id=064 bgcolor=#E9E9E9
| 267064 ||  || — || March 20, 1999 || Apache Point || SDSS || — || align=right | 1.4 km || 
|-id=065 bgcolor=#E9E9E9
| 267065 ||  || — || September 3, 1999 || Kitt Peak || Spacewatch || JUN || align=right | 1.5 km || 
|-id=066 bgcolor=#fefefe
| 267066 ||  || — || September 8, 1999 || Socorro || LINEAR || PHO || align=right | 1.4 km || 
|-id=067 bgcolor=#fefefe
| 267067 ||  || — || September 7, 1999 || Socorro || LINEAR || — || align=right | 1.2 km || 
|-id=068 bgcolor=#fefefe
| 267068 ||  || — || September 7, 1999 || Socorro || LINEAR || — || align=right | 1.1 km || 
|-id=069 bgcolor=#fefefe
| 267069 ||  || — || October 4, 1999 || Kitt Peak || Spacewatch || — || align=right data-sort-value="0.66" | 660 m || 
|-id=070 bgcolor=#E9E9E9
| 267070 ||  || — || October 8, 1999 || Kitt Peak || Spacewatch || WIT || align=right | 1.4 km || 
|-id=071 bgcolor=#E9E9E9
| 267071 ||  || — || October 8, 1999 || Kitt Peak || Spacewatch || — || align=right | 3.2 km || 
|-id=072 bgcolor=#fefefe
| 267072 ||  || — || October 9, 1999 || Kitt Peak || Spacewatch || — || align=right data-sort-value="0.89" | 890 m || 
|-id=073 bgcolor=#E9E9E9
| 267073 ||  || — || October 12, 1999 || Kitt Peak || Spacewatch || AGN || align=right | 1.4 km || 
|-id=074 bgcolor=#fefefe
| 267074 ||  || — || October 3, 1999 || Socorro || LINEAR || FLO || align=right data-sort-value="0.89" | 890 m || 
|-id=075 bgcolor=#d6d6d6
| 267075 ||  || — || October 10, 1999 || Socorro || LINEAR || — || align=right | 3.8 km || 
|-id=076 bgcolor=#fefefe
| 267076 ||  || — || October 12, 1999 || Socorro || LINEAR || — || align=right data-sort-value="0.82" | 820 m || 
|-id=077 bgcolor=#fefefe
| 267077 ||  || — || October 13, 1999 || Socorro || LINEAR || — || align=right data-sort-value="0.93" | 930 m || 
|-id=078 bgcolor=#E9E9E9
| 267078 ||  || — || October 1, 1999 || Kitt Peak || Spacewatch || GEF || align=right | 1.6 km || 
|-id=079 bgcolor=#FA8072
| 267079 ||  || — || October 3, 1999 || Socorro || LINEAR || H || align=right data-sort-value="0.98" | 980 m || 
|-id=080 bgcolor=#fefefe
| 267080 ||  || — || October 1, 1999 || Kitt Peak || Spacewatch || — || align=right data-sort-value="0.93" | 930 m || 
|-id=081 bgcolor=#E9E9E9
| 267081 ||  || — || October 12, 1999 || Kitt Peak || Spacewatch || — || align=right | 3.0 km || 
|-id=082 bgcolor=#d6d6d6
| 267082 ||  || — || October 31, 1999 || Kitt Peak || Spacewatch || — || align=right | 2.4 km || 
|-id=083 bgcolor=#fefefe
| 267083 ||  || — || November 4, 1999 || Socorro || LINEAR || EUT || align=right data-sort-value="0.79" | 790 m || 
|-id=084 bgcolor=#E9E9E9
| 267084 ||  || — || November 5, 1999 || Kitt Peak || Spacewatch || WIT || align=right | 1.6 km || 
|-id=085 bgcolor=#d6d6d6
| 267085 ||  || — || November 5, 1999 || Kitt Peak || Spacewatch || KOR || align=right | 1.9 km || 
|-id=086 bgcolor=#fefefe
| 267086 ||  || — || November 1, 1999 || Kitt Peak || Spacewatch || FLO || align=right data-sort-value="0.73" | 730 m || 
|-id=087 bgcolor=#d6d6d6
| 267087 ||  || — || November 5, 1999 || Socorro || LINEAR || BRA || align=right | 2.5 km || 
|-id=088 bgcolor=#E9E9E9
| 267088 ||  || — || November 9, 1999 || Kitt Peak || Spacewatch || — || align=right | 3.5 km || 
|-id=089 bgcolor=#E9E9E9
| 267089 ||  || — || November 10, 1999 || Kitt Peak || Spacewatch || — || align=right | 4.0 km || 
|-id=090 bgcolor=#fefefe
| 267090 ||  || — || November 3, 1999 || Catalina || CSS || PHO || align=right | 2.1 km || 
|-id=091 bgcolor=#d6d6d6
| 267091 ||  || — || November 12, 1999 || Socorro || LINEAR || KOR || align=right | 1.9 km || 
|-id=092 bgcolor=#fefefe
| 267092 ||  || — || November 1, 1999 || Kitt Peak || Spacewatch || — || align=right data-sort-value="0.86" | 860 m || 
|-id=093 bgcolor=#E9E9E9
| 267093 ||  || — || December 7, 1999 || Socorro || LINEAR || DOR || align=right | 4.2 km || 
|-id=094 bgcolor=#d6d6d6
| 267094 ||  || — || December 12, 1999 || Socorro || LINEAR || fast? || align=right | 5.1 km || 
|-id=095 bgcolor=#fefefe
| 267095 ||  || — || December 2, 1999 || Kitt Peak || Spacewatch || — || align=right data-sort-value="0.73" | 730 m || 
|-id=096 bgcolor=#fefefe
| 267096 ||  || — || December 2, 1999 || Kitt Peak || Spacewatch || — || align=right | 1.1 km || 
|-id=097 bgcolor=#d6d6d6
| 267097 ||  || — || December 7, 1999 || Kitt Peak || Spacewatch || KOR || align=right | 1.9 km || 
|-id=098 bgcolor=#d6d6d6
| 267098 ||  || — || December 13, 1999 || Kitt Peak || Spacewatch || — || align=right | 3.9 km || 
|-id=099 bgcolor=#C2FFFF
| 267099 ||  || — || December 15, 1999 || Kitt Peak || Spacewatch || L4 || align=right | 15 km || 
|-id=100 bgcolor=#fefefe
| 267100 ||  || — || December 9, 1999 || Kitt Peak || Spacewatch || FLO || align=right data-sort-value="0.68" | 680 m || 
|}

267101–267200 

|-bgcolor=#d6d6d6
| 267101 ||  || — || December 12, 1999 || Kitt Peak || Spacewatch || — || align=right | 2.9 km || 
|-id=102 bgcolor=#FA8072
| 267102 ||  || — || December 17, 1999 || Socorro || LINEAR || H || align=right | 1.1 km || 
|-id=103 bgcolor=#fefefe
| 267103 ||  || — || December 19, 1999 || Socorro || LINEAR || PHO || align=right | 1.6 km || 
|-id=104 bgcolor=#fefefe
| 267104 ||  || — || January 3, 2000 || Socorro || LINEAR || NYS || align=right data-sort-value="0.86" | 860 m || 
|-id=105 bgcolor=#fefefe
| 267105 ||  || — || January 5, 2000 || Socorro || LINEAR || FLO || align=right | 1.0 km || 
|-id=106 bgcolor=#fefefe
| 267106 ||  || — || January 5, 2000 || Socorro || LINEAR || ERI || align=right | 2.2 km || 
|-id=107 bgcolor=#fefefe
| 267107 ||  || — || January 3, 2000 || Socorro || LINEAR || H || align=right data-sort-value="0.80" | 800 m || 
|-id=108 bgcolor=#fefefe
| 267108 ||  || — || January 8, 2000 || Kitt Peak || Spacewatch || — || align=right data-sort-value="0.87" | 870 m || 
|-id=109 bgcolor=#d6d6d6
| 267109 ||  || — || January 4, 2000 || Socorro || LINEAR || — || align=right | 3.2 km || 
|-id=110 bgcolor=#fefefe
| 267110 ||  || — || January 29, 2000 || Kitt Peak || Spacewatch || V || align=right data-sort-value="0.85" | 850 m || 
|-id=111 bgcolor=#fefefe
| 267111 ||  || — || February 2, 2000 || Socorro || LINEAR || — || align=right | 1.3 km || 
|-id=112 bgcolor=#fefefe
| 267112 ||  || — || February 2, 2000 || Socorro || LINEAR || — || align=right | 1.2 km || 
|-id=113 bgcolor=#d6d6d6
| 267113 ||  || — || February 2, 2000 || Socorro || LINEAR || EUP || align=right | 6.4 km || 
|-id=114 bgcolor=#d6d6d6
| 267114 ||  || — || February 12, 2000 || Kitt Peak || Spacewatch || — || align=right | 5.1 km || 
|-id=115 bgcolor=#d6d6d6
| 267115 ||  || — || February 4, 2000 || Socorro || LINEAR || — || align=right | 5.6 km || 
|-id=116 bgcolor=#fefefe
| 267116 ||  || — || February 3, 2000 || Socorro || LINEAR || NYS || align=right data-sort-value="0.89" | 890 m || 
|-id=117 bgcolor=#fefefe
| 267117 ||  || — || February 26, 2000 || Kitt Peak || Spacewatch || — || align=right | 1.2 km || 
|-id=118 bgcolor=#d6d6d6
| 267118 ||  || — || February 29, 2000 || Socorro || LINEAR || — || align=right | 5.4 km || 
|-id=119 bgcolor=#d6d6d6
| 267119 ||  || — || February 29, 2000 || Socorro || LINEAR || — || align=right | 4.4 km || 
|-id=120 bgcolor=#d6d6d6
| 267120 ||  || — || February 29, 2000 || Socorro || LINEAR || URS || align=right | 4.6 km || 
|-id=121 bgcolor=#d6d6d6
| 267121 ||  || — || February 29, 2000 || Socorro || LINEAR || — || align=right | 4.8 km || 
|-id=122 bgcolor=#fefefe
| 267122 ||  || — || February 27, 2000 || Kitt Peak || Spacewatch || V || align=right data-sort-value="0.86" | 860 m || 
|-id=123 bgcolor=#d6d6d6
| 267123 ||  || — || February 27, 2000 || Kitt Peak || Spacewatch || THM || align=right | 2.6 km || 
|-id=124 bgcolor=#d6d6d6
| 267124 ||  || — || February 29, 2000 || Socorro || LINEAR || — || align=right | 4.2 km || 
|-id=125 bgcolor=#fefefe
| 267125 ||  || — || February 29, 2000 || Socorro || LINEAR || NYS || align=right data-sort-value="0.90" | 900 m || 
|-id=126 bgcolor=#fefefe
| 267126 ||  || — || February 27, 2000 || Kitt Peak || Spacewatch || H || align=right data-sort-value="0.66" | 660 m || 
|-id=127 bgcolor=#d6d6d6
| 267127 ||  || — || February 25, 2000 || Kitt Peak || Spacewatch || EOS || align=right | 2.6 km || 
|-id=128 bgcolor=#d6d6d6
| 267128 ||  || — || March 2, 2000 || Kitt Peak || Spacewatch || EOS || align=right | 2.7 km || 
|-id=129 bgcolor=#fefefe
| 267129 ||  || — || March 5, 2000 || Socorro || LINEAR || NYS || align=right data-sort-value="0.90" | 900 m || 
|-id=130 bgcolor=#fefefe
| 267130 ||  || — || March 3, 2000 || Kitt Peak || Spacewatch || NYSfast? || align=right data-sort-value="0.89" | 890 m || 
|-id=131 bgcolor=#FFC2E0
| 267131 ||  || — || March 4, 2000 || Socorro || LINEAR || APO +1kmPHAcritical || align=right data-sort-value="0.81" | 810 m || 
|-id=132 bgcolor=#d6d6d6
| 267132 ||  || — || March 3, 2000 || Socorro || LINEAR || — || align=right | 4.5 km || 
|-id=133 bgcolor=#d6d6d6
| 267133 ||  || — || March 4, 2000 || Socorro || LINEAR || EOS || align=right | 6.3 km || 
|-id=134 bgcolor=#fefefe
| 267134 ||  || — || March 10, 2000 || Socorro || LINEAR || — || align=right data-sort-value="0.96" | 960 m || 
|-id=135 bgcolor=#fefefe
| 267135 ||  || — || March 10, 2000 || Socorro || LINEAR || NYS || align=right data-sort-value="0.81" | 810 m || 
|-id=136 bgcolor=#FFC2E0
| 267136 ||  || — || March 11, 2000 || Catalina || CSS || APO || align=right data-sort-value="0.60" | 600 m || 
|-id=137 bgcolor=#fefefe
| 267137 ||  || — || March 10, 2000 || Kitt Peak || Spacewatch || NYS || align=right data-sort-value="0.85" | 850 m || 
|-id=138 bgcolor=#d6d6d6
| 267138 ||  || — || March 11, 2000 || Anderson Mesa || LONEOS || — || align=right | 4.4 km || 
|-id=139 bgcolor=#fefefe
| 267139 ||  || — || March 6, 2000 || Haleakala || NEAT || — || align=right | 1.3 km || 
|-id=140 bgcolor=#d6d6d6
| 267140 ||  || — || March 3, 2000 || Socorro || LINEAR || — || align=right | 4.1 km || 
|-id=141 bgcolor=#d6d6d6
| 267141 ||  || — || March 5, 2000 || Socorro || LINEAR || — || align=right | 4.9 km || 
|-id=142 bgcolor=#fefefe
| 267142 ||  || — || March 3, 2000 || Socorro || LINEAR || NYS || align=right data-sort-value="0.82" | 820 m || 
|-id=143 bgcolor=#d6d6d6
| 267143 ||  || — || March 27, 2000 || Kitt Peak || Spacewatch || EOS || align=right | 2.7 km || 
|-id=144 bgcolor=#fefefe
| 267144 ||  || — || March 25, 2000 || Kitt Peak || Spacewatch || — || align=right | 1.1 km || 
|-id=145 bgcolor=#fefefe
| 267145 ||  || — || March 29, 2000 || Socorro || LINEAR || H || align=right data-sort-value="0.92" | 920 m || 
|-id=146 bgcolor=#fefefe
| 267146 ||  || — || March 29, 2000 || Socorro || LINEAR || — || align=right | 1.4 km || 
|-id=147 bgcolor=#d6d6d6
| 267147 ||  || — || March 29, 2000 || Socorro || LINEAR || EUP || align=right | 5.5 km || 
|-id=148 bgcolor=#d6d6d6
| 267148 ||  || — || March 26, 2000 || Anderson Mesa || LONEOS || — || align=right | 4.4 km || 
|-id=149 bgcolor=#d6d6d6
| 267149 ||  || — || March 25, 2000 || Kitt Peak || Spacewatch || — || align=right | 3.3 km || 
|-id=150 bgcolor=#fefefe
| 267150 ||  || — || April 3, 2000 || Socorro || LINEAR || H || align=right | 1.1 km || 
|-id=151 bgcolor=#fefefe
| 267151 ||  || — || April 5, 2000 || Socorro || LINEAR || NYS || align=right data-sort-value="0.84" | 840 m || 
|-id=152 bgcolor=#fefefe
| 267152 ||  || — || April 5, 2000 || Socorro || LINEAR || V || align=right data-sort-value="0.99" | 990 m || 
|-id=153 bgcolor=#fefefe
| 267153 ||  || — || April 5, 2000 || Socorro || LINEAR || NYS || align=right data-sort-value="0.92" | 920 m || 
|-id=154 bgcolor=#d6d6d6
| 267154 ||  || — || April 5, 2000 || Socorro || LINEAR || — || align=right | 3.4 km || 
|-id=155 bgcolor=#fefefe
| 267155 ||  || — || April 4, 2000 || Socorro || LINEAR || NYS || align=right | 1.1 km || 
|-id=156 bgcolor=#fefefe
| 267156 ||  || — || April 7, 2000 || Socorro || LINEAR || NYS || align=right | 1.2 km || 
|-id=157 bgcolor=#fefefe
| 267157 ||  || — || April 5, 2000 || Kitt Peak || Spacewatch || MAS || align=right data-sort-value="0.78" | 780 m || 
|-id=158 bgcolor=#fefefe
| 267158 ||  || — || April 7, 2000 || Anderson Mesa || LONEOS || — || align=right | 1.4 km || 
|-id=159 bgcolor=#d6d6d6
| 267159 ||  || — || April 5, 2000 || Socorro || LINEAR || — || align=right | 4.0 km || 
|-id=160 bgcolor=#d6d6d6
| 267160 ||  || — || April 3, 2000 || Socorro || LINEAR || EUP || align=right | 3.7 km || 
|-id=161 bgcolor=#d6d6d6
| 267161 ||  || — || April 2, 2000 || Anderson Mesa || LONEOS || TIR || align=right | 3.6 km || 
|-id=162 bgcolor=#d6d6d6
| 267162 ||  || — || April 28, 2000 || Socorro || LINEAR || Tj (2.98) || align=right | 4.4 km || 
|-id=163 bgcolor=#d6d6d6
| 267163 ||  || — || April 25, 2000 || Anderson Mesa || LONEOS || — || align=right | 4.8 km || 
|-id=164 bgcolor=#d6d6d6
| 267164 ||  || — || April 29, 2000 || Socorro || LINEAR || EUP || align=right | 4.5 km || 
|-id=165 bgcolor=#d6d6d6
| 267165 ||  || — || April 25, 2000 || Anderson Mesa || LONEOS || — || align=right | 2.8 km || 
|-id=166 bgcolor=#fefefe
| 267166 ||  || — || April 25, 2000 || Anderson Mesa || LONEOS || — || align=right | 1.3 km || 
|-id=167 bgcolor=#fefefe
| 267167 ||  || — || April 29, 2000 || Socorro || LINEAR || MAS || align=right | 1.0 km || 
|-id=168 bgcolor=#fefefe
| 267168 ||  || — || April 30, 2000 || Anderson Mesa || LONEOS || NYS || align=right data-sort-value="0.96" | 960 m || 
|-id=169 bgcolor=#fefefe
| 267169 ||  || — || April 26, 2000 || Anderson Mesa || LONEOS || MAS || align=right | 1.0 km || 
|-id=170 bgcolor=#fefefe
| 267170 ||  || — || April 27, 2000 || Anderson Mesa || LONEOS || — || align=right | 1.2 km || 
|-id=171 bgcolor=#d6d6d6
| 267171 ||  || — || May 2, 2000 || Socorro || LINEAR || — || align=right | 5.0 km || 
|-id=172 bgcolor=#fefefe
| 267172 ||  || — || May 2, 2000 || Socorro || LINEAR || PHO || align=right | 1.3 km || 
|-id=173 bgcolor=#fefefe
| 267173 ||  || — || May 6, 2000 || Socorro || LINEAR || NYS || align=right data-sort-value="0.83" | 830 m || 
|-id=174 bgcolor=#fefefe
| 267174 ||  || — || May 28, 2000 || Socorro || LINEAR || V || align=right | 1.1 km || 
|-id=175 bgcolor=#E9E9E9
| 267175 ||  || — || June 25, 2000 || Haleakala || NEAT || — || align=right | 4.2 km || 
|-id=176 bgcolor=#E9E9E9
| 267176 || 2000 OO || — || July 23, 2000 || Reedy Creek || J. Broughton || MIT || align=right | 3.5 km || 
|-id=177 bgcolor=#E9E9E9
| 267177 ||  || — || July 30, 2000 || Socorro || LINEAR || — || align=right | 1.9 km || 
|-id=178 bgcolor=#fefefe
| 267178 ||  || — || July 30, 2000 || Socorro || LINEAR || — || align=right | 1.4 km || 
|-id=179 bgcolor=#E9E9E9
| 267179 ||  || — || August 22, 2000 || Prescott || P. G. Comba || — || align=right | 1.1 km || 
|-id=180 bgcolor=#E9E9E9
| 267180 ||  || — || August 26, 2000 || Socorro || LINEAR || BRG || align=right | 2.8 km || 
|-id=181 bgcolor=#E9E9E9
| 267181 ||  || — || August 26, 2000 || Socorro || LINEAR || MAR || align=right | 1.8 km || 
|-id=182 bgcolor=#E9E9E9
| 267182 ||  || — || August 26, 2000 || Socorro || LINEAR || — || align=right | 2.8 km || 
|-id=183 bgcolor=#E9E9E9
| 267183 ||  || — || August 28, 2000 || Socorro || LINEAR || — || align=right | 1.6 km || 
|-id=184 bgcolor=#E9E9E9
| 267184 ||  || — || August 28, 2000 || Socorro || LINEAR || — || align=right | 2.5 km || 
|-id=185 bgcolor=#E9E9E9
| 267185 ||  || — || August 25, 2000 || Socorro || LINEAR || EUN || align=right | 1.8 km || 
|-id=186 bgcolor=#E9E9E9
| 267186 ||  || — || August 31, 2000 || Socorro || LINEAR || — || align=right | 3.1 km || 
|-id=187 bgcolor=#E9E9E9
| 267187 ||  || — || August 31, 2000 || Socorro || LINEAR || — || align=right | 1.7 km || 
|-id=188 bgcolor=#E9E9E9
| 267188 ||  || — || August 31, 2000 || Socorro || LINEAR || — || align=right | 3.2 km || 
|-id=189 bgcolor=#E9E9E9
| 267189 ||  || — || August 31, 2000 || Socorro || LINEAR || — || align=right | 2.0 km || 
|-id=190 bgcolor=#E9E9E9
| 267190 ||  || — || August 29, 2000 || Socorro || LINEAR || — || align=right | 1.9 km || 
|-id=191 bgcolor=#E9E9E9
| 267191 ||  || — || August 29, 2000 || Socorro || LINEAR || — || align=right | 2.0 km || 
|-id=192 bgcolor=#E9E9E9
| 267192 ||  || — || August 31, 2000 || Socorro || LINEAR || ADE || align=right | 2.2 km || 
|-id=193 bgcolor=#E9E9E9
| 267193 ||  || — || September 1, 2000 || Socorro || LINEAR || JUN || align=right | 1.5 km || 
|-id=194 bgcolor=#E9E9E9
| 267194 ||  || — || September 1, 2000 || Socorro || LINEAR || JUN || align=right | 2.3 km || 
|-id=195 bgcolor=#E9E9E9
| 267195 ||  || — || September 3, 2000 || Socorro || LINEAR || — || align=right | 5.2 km || 
|-id=196 bgcolor=#E9E9E9
| 267196 ||  || — || September 3, 2000 || Socorro || LINEAR || — || align=right | 3.7 km || 
|-id=197 bgcolor=#E9E9E9
| 267197 ||  || — || September 23, 2000 || Socorro || LINEAR || HNS || align=right | 2.5 km || 
|-id=198 bgcolor=#E9E9E9
| 267198 ||  || — || September 22, 2000 || Socorro || LINEAR || MAR || align=right | 1.9 km || 
|-id=199 bgcolor=#E9E9E9
| 267199 ||  || — || September 24, 2000 || Socorro || LINEAR || — || align=right | 1.6 km || 
|-id=200 bgcolor=#E9E9E9
| 267200 ||  || — || September 24, 2000 || Socorro || LINEAR || — || align=right | 3.9 km || 
|}

267201–267300 

|-bgcolor=#E9E9E9
| 267201 ||  || — || September 23, 2000 || Socorro || LINEAR || — || align=right | 2.7 km || 
|-id=202 bgcolor=#E9E9E9
| 267202 ||  || — || September 23, 2000 || Socorro || LINEAR || WIT || align=right | 1.5 km || 
|-id=203 bgcolor=#E9E9E9
| 267203 ||  || — || September 23, 2000 || Socorro || LINEAR || — || align=right | 2.3 km || 
|-id=204 bgcolor=#E9E9E9
| 267204 ||  || — || September 23, 2000 || Socorro || LINEAR || — || align=right | 2.4 km || 
|-id=205 bgcolor=#E9E9E9
| 267205 ||  || — || September 28, 2000 || Socorro || LINEAR || MAR || align=right | 1.8 km || 
|-id=206 bgcolor=#E9E9E9
| 267206 ||  || — || September 24, 2000 || Socorro || LINEAR || — || align=right | 1.3 km || 
|-id=207 bgcolor=#E9E9E9
| 267207 ||  || — || September 24, 2000 || Socorro || LINEAR || — || align=right | 3.5 km || 
|-id=208 bgcolor=#E9E9E9
| 267208 ||  || — || September 26, 2000 || Socorro || LINEAR || — || align=right | 2.6 km || 
|-id=209 bgcolor=#E9E9E9
| 267209 ||  || — || September 30, 2000 || Socorro || LINEAR || — || align=right | 2.6 km || 
|-id=210 bgcolor=#E9E9E9
| 267210 ||  || — || September 29, 2000 || Bergisch Gladbach || W. Bickel || — || align=right | 1.3 km || 
|-id=211 bgcolor=#E9E9E9
| 267211 ||  || — || September 20, 2000 || Socorro || LINEAR || MAR || align=right | 1.5 km || 
|-id=212 bgcolor=#E9E9E9
| 267212 ||  || — || October 1, 2000 || Socorro || LINEAR || — || align=right | 3.1 km || 
|-id=213 bgcolor=#E9E9E9
| 267213 ||  || — || October 2, 2000 || Socorro || LINEAR || — || align=right | 2.3 km || 
|-id=214 bgcolor=#E9E9E9
| 267214 ||  || — || October 2, 2000 || Anderson Mesa || LONEOS || — || align=right | 2.7 km || 
|-id=215 bgcolor=#E9E9E9
| 267215 ||  || — || October 25, 2000 || Socorro || LINEAR || — || align=right | 2.0 km || 
|-id=216 bgcolor=#fefefe
| 267216 ||  || — || October 25, 2000 || Socorro || LINEAR || — || align=right data-sort-value="0.75" | 750 m || 
|-id=217 bgcolor=#E9E9E9
| 267217 ||  || — || November 1, 2000 || Socorro || LINEAR || — || align=right | 3.1 km || 
|-id=218 bgcolor=#E9E9E9
| 267218 ||  || — || November 27, 2000 || Socorro || LINEAR || — || align=right | 2.5 km || 
|-id=219 bgcolor=#E9E9E9
| 267219 ||  || — || November 29, 2000 || Kitt Peak || Spacewatch || GEF || align=right | 1.9 km || 
|-id=220 bgcolor=#E9E9E9
| 267220 ||  || — || November 30, 2000 || Socorro || LINEAR || — || align=right | 2.0 km || 
|-id=221 bgcolor=#FFC2E0
| 267221 ||  || — || January 2, 2001 || Socorro || LINEAR || APOPHA || align=right data-sort-value="0.56" | 560 m || 
|-id=222 bgcolor=#d6d6d6
| 267222 ||  || — || February 16, 2001 || Kitt Peak || Spacewatch || — || align=right | 2.7 km || 
|-id=223 bgcolor=#FFC2E0
| 267223 ||  || — || February 16, 2001 || Socorro || LINEAR || APO +1km || align=right data-sort-value="0.85" | 850 m || 
|-id=224 bgcolor=#d6d6d6
| 267224 ||  || — || March 19, 2001 || Kitt Peak || Spacewatch || BRA || align=right | 2.1 km || 
|-id=225 bgcolor=#fefefe
| 267225 ||  || — || March 19, 2001 || Anderson Mesa || LONEOS || — || align=right | 1.1 km || 
|-id=226 bgcolor=#fefefe
| 267226 ||  || — || March 19, 2001 || Socorro || LINEAR || FLO || align=right data-sort-value="0.97" | 970 m || 
|-id=227 bgcolor=#d6d6d6
| 267227 ||  || — || March 19, 2001 || Socorro || LINEAR || — || align=right | 3.5 km || 
|-id=228 bgcolor=#d6d6d6
| 267228 ||  || — || March 24, 2001 || Kitt Peak || Spacewatch || — || align=right | 3.0 km || 
|-id=229 bgcolor=#fefefe
| 267229 ||  || — || March 21, 2001 || Kitt Peak || Spacewatch || — || align=right | 1.1 km || 
|-id=230 bgcolor=#d6d6d6
| 267230 ||  || — || April 18, 2001 || Prescott || P. G. Comba || — || align=right | 5.6 km || 
|-id=231 bgcolor=#fefefe
| 267231 ||  || — || April 23, 2001 || Kitt Peak || Spacewatch || — || align=right data-sort-value="0.91" | 910 m || 
|-id=232 bgcolor=#d6d6d6
| 267232 ||  || — || April 26, 2001 || Socorro || LINEAR || — || align=right | 4.2 km || 
|-id=233 bgcolor=#d6d6d6
| 267233 ||  || — || April 23, 2001 || Socorro || LINEAR || — || align=right | 5.9 km || 
|-id=234 bgcolor=#d6d6d6
| 267234 ||  || — || April 27, 2001 || Socorro || LINEAR || — || align=right | 4.3 km || 
|-id=235 bgcolor=#fefefe
| 267235 ||  || — || May 17, 2001 || Socorro || LINEAR || PHO || align=right | 1.8 km || 
|-id=236 bgcolor=#fefefe
| 267236 ||  || — || May 18, 2001 || Socorro || LINEAR || FLO || align=right | 1.00 km || 
|-id=237 bgcolor=#d6d6d6
| 267237 ||  || — || May 23, 2001 || Socorro || LINEAR || — || align=right | 3.8 km || 
|-id=238 bgcolor=#fefefe
| 267238 ||  || — || May 22, 2001 || Socorro || LINEAR || — || align=right | 1.3 km || 
|-id=239 bgcolor=#fefefe
| 267239 ||  || — || May 17, 2001 || Socorro || LINEAR || NYS || align=right | 2.4 km || 
|-id=240 bgcolor=#fefefe
| 267240 ||  || — || July 13, 2001 || Palomar || NEAT || — || align=right | 1.1 km || 
|-id=241 bgcolor=#fefefe
| 267241 ||  || — || July 15, 2001 || Haleakala || NEAT || — || align=right | 1.9 km || 
|-id=242 bgcolor=#fefefe
| 267242 ||  || — || July 24, 2001 || Palomar || NEAT || — || align=right | 1.3 km || 
|-id=243 bgcolor=#fefefe
| 267243 ||  || — || July 20, 2001 || Palomar || NEAT || — || align=right | 1.4 km || 
|-id=244 bgcolor=#fefefe
| 267244 ||  || — || July 20, 2001 || Palomar || NEAT || — || align=right data-sort-value="0.96" | 960 m || 
|-id=245 bgcolor=#d6d6d6
| 267245 ||  || — || July 21, 2001 || Palomar || NEAT || — || align=right | 3.3 km || 
|-id=246 bgcolor=#fefefe
| 267246 ||  || — || July 16, 2001 || Anderson Mesa || LONEOS || — || align=right | 1.3 km || 
|-id=247 bgcolor=#fefefe
| 267247 ||  || — || July 29, 2001 || Palomar || NEAT || KLI || align=right | 3.3 km || 
|-id=248 bgcolor=#fefefe
| 267248 ||  || — || July 27, 2001 || Anderson Mesa || LONEOS || — || align=right | 1.2 km || 
|-id=249 bgcolor=#fefefe
| 267249 ||  || — || August 6, 2001 || Haleakala || NEAT || H || align=right | 1.0 km || 
|-id=250 bgcolor=#fefefe
| 267250 ||  || — || August 11, 2001 || Haleakala || NEAT || — || align=right | 1.3 km || 
|-id=251 bgcolor=#fefefe
| 267251 ||  || — || August 11, 2001 || Haleakala || NEAT || ERI || align=right | 2.3 km || 
|-id=252 bgcolor=#fefefe
| 267252 ||  || — || August 14, 2001 || Haleakala || NEAT || — || align=right | 1.1 km || 
|-id=253 bgcolor=#fefefe
| 267253 ||  || — || August 14, 2001 || Haleakala || NEAT || — || align=right | 1.2 km || 
|-id=254 bgcolor=#fefefe
| 267254 ||  || — || August 16, 2001 || Socorro || LINEAR || — || align=right | 1.1 km || 
|-id=255 bgcolor=#E9E9E9
| 267255 ||  || — || August 16, 2001 || Socorro || LINEAR || — || align=right | 1.6 km || 
|-id=256 bgcolor=#fefefe
| 267256 ||  || — || August 16, 2001 || Socorro || LINEAR || NYS || align=right data-sort-value="0.80" | 800 m || 
|-id=257 bgcolor=#E9E9E9
| 267257 ||  || — || August 19, 2001 || Socorro || LINEAR || — || align=right | 1.6 km || 
|-id=258 bgcolor=#fefefe
| 267258 ||  || — || August 26, 2001 || Haleakala || NEAT || V || align=right data-sort-value="0.92" | 920 m || 
|-id=259 bgcolor=#fefefe
| 267259 ||  || — || August 22, 2001 || Kitt Peak || Spacewatch || H || align=right data-sort-value="0.71" | 710 m || 
|-id=260 bgcolor=#fefefe
| 267260 ||  || — || August 26, 2001 || Haleakala || NEAT || — || align=right | 1.4 km || 
|-id=261 bgcolor=#fefefe
| 267261 ||  || — || August 25, 2001 || Palomar || NEAT || NYS || align=right | 1.3 km || 
|-id=262 bgcolor=#fefefe
| 267262 ||  || — || August 23, 2001 || Anderson Mesa || LONEOS || — || align=right | 1.3 km || 
|-id=263 bgcolor=#fefefe
| 267263 ||  || — || August 24, 2001 || Anderson Mesa || LONEOS || V || align=right | 1.1 km || 
|-id=264 bgcolor=#fefefe
| 267264 ||  || — || August 24, 2001 || Anderson Mesa || LONEOS || H || align=right | 1.2 km || 
|-id=265 bgcolor=#fefefe
| 267265 ||  || — || August 25, 2001 || Socorro || LINEAR || V || align=right | 1.1 km || 
|-id=266 bgcolor=#fefefe
| 267266 ||  || — || August 26, 2001 || Desert Eagle || W. K. Y. Yeung || V || align=right data-sort-value="0.95" | 950 m || 
|-id=267 bgcolor=#fefefe
| 267267 ||  || — || August 19, 2001 || Socorro || LINEAR || MAS || align=right data-sort-value="0.84" | 840 m || 
|-id=268 bgcolor=#fefefe
| 267268 ||  || — || August 24, 2001 || Anderson Mesa || LONEOS || V || align=right data-sort-value="0.80" | 800 m || 
|-id=269 bgcolor=#E9E9E9
| 267269 ||  || — || September 8, 2001 || Socorro || LINEAR || — || align=right | 1.4 km || 
|-id=270 bgcolor=#FFC2E0
| 267270 ||  || — || September 11, 2001 || Socorro || LINEAR || AMO +1km || align=right data-sort-value="0.85" | 850 m || 
|-id=271 bgcolor=#fefefe
| 267271 ||  || — || September 7, 2001 || Socorro || LINEAR || MAS || align=right | 1.0 km || 
|-id=272 bgcolor=#fefefe
| 267272 ||  || — || September 7, 2001 || Socorro || LINEAR || NYS || align=right data-sort-value="0.89" | 890 m || 
|-id=273 bgcolor=#d6d6d6
| 267273 ||  || — || September 8, 2001 || Socorro || LINEAR || THB || align=right | 3.8 km || 
|-id=274 bgcolor=#E9E9E9
| 267274 ||  || — || September 12, 2001 || Socorro || LINEAR || BAR || align=right | 1.6 km || 
|-id=275 bgcolor=#fefefe
| 267275 ||  || — || September 12, 2001 || Socorro || LINEAR || H || align=right | 1.2 km || 
|-id=276 bgcolor=#fefefe
| 267276 ||  || — || September 10, 2001 || Socorro || LINEAR || V || align=right | 1.2 km || 
|-id=277 bgcolor=#fefefe
| 267277 ||  || — || September 12, 2001 || Socorro || LINEAR || — || align=right | 1.1 km || 
|-id=278 bgcolor=#fefefe
| 267278 ||  || — || September 12, 2001 || Socorro || LINEAR || — || align=right | 1.2 km || 
|-id=279 bgcolor=#fefefe
| 267279 ||  || — || September 12, 2001 || Socorro || LINEAR || — || align=right | 1.2 km || 
|-id=280 bgcolor=#fefefe
| 267280 ||  || — || September 11, 2001 || Anderson Mesa || LONEOS || — || align=right | 1.4 km || 
|-id=281 bgcolor=#E9E9E9
| 267281 ||  || — || September 16, 2001 || Socorro || LINEAR || — || align=right | 1.2 km || 
|-id=282 bgcolor=#E9E9E9
| 267282 ||  || — || September 16, 2001 || Socorro || LINEAR || — || align=right | 1.1 km || 
|-id=283 bgcolor=#fefefe
| 267283 ||  || — || September 16, 2001 || Socorro || LINEAR || MAS || align=right data-sort-value="0.97" | 970 m || 
|-id=284 bgcolor=#E9E9E9
| 267284 ||  || — || September 16, 2001 || Socorro || LINEAR || — || align=right | 1.7 km || 
|-id=285 bgcolor=#fefefe
| 267285 ||  || — || September 17, 2001 || Socorro || LINEAR || — || align=right | 1.7 km || 
|-id=286 bgcolor=#fefefe
| 267286 ||  || — || September 17, 2001 || Socorro || LINEAR || H || align=right data-sort-value="0.89" | 890 m || 
|-id=287 bgcolor=#fefefe
| 267287 ||  || — || September 19, 2001 || Socorro || LINEAR || MAS || align=right | 1.0 km || 
|-id=288 bgcolor=#fefefe
| 267288 ||  || — || September 20, 2001 || Socorro || LINEAR || NYS || align=right data-sort-value="0.87" | 870 m || 
|-id=289 bgcolor=#fefefe
| 267289 ||  || — || September 20, 2001 || Socorro || LINEAR || V || align=right | 1.0 km || 
|-id=290 bgcolor=#E9E9E9
| 267290 ||  || — || September 16, 2001 || Socorro || LINEAR || — || align=right | 1.1 km || 
|-id=291 bgcolor=#fefefe
| 267291 ||  || — || September 16, 2001 || Socorro || LINEAR || — || align=right | 1.4 km || 
|-id=292 bgcolor=#fefefe
| 267292 ||  || — || September 16, 2001 || Socorro || LINEAR || — || align=right | 1.3 km || 
|-id=293 bgcolor=#fefefe
| 267293 ||  || — || September 17, 2001 || Socorro || LINEAR || NYS || align=right | 1.0 km || 
|-id=294 bgcolor=#E9E9E9
| 267294 ||  || — || September 16, 2001 || Socorro || LINEAR || — || align=right | 1.4 km || 
|-id=295 bgcolor=#fefefe
| 267295 ||  || — || September 16, 2001 || Socorro || LINEAR || — || align=right | 1.3 km || 
|-id=296 bgcolor=#d6d6d6
| 267296 ||  || — || September 19, 2001 || Socorro || LINEAR || ALA || align=right | 4.3 km || 
|-id=297 bgcolor=#fefefe
| 267297 ||  || — || September 19, 2001 || Socorro || LINEAR || — || align=right | 1.1 km || 
|-id=298 bgcolor=#fefefe
| 267298 ||  || — || September 19, 2001 || Socorro || LINEAR || NYS || align=right data-sort-value="0.84" | 840 m || 
|-id=299 bgcolor=#fefefe
| 267299 ||  || — || September 19, 2001 || Socorro || LINEAR || — || align=right | 1.2 km || 
|-id=300 bgcolor=#d6d6d6
| 267300 ||  || — || September 19, 2001 || Socorro || LINEAR || Tj (2.96) || align=right | 5.3 km || 
|}

267301–267400 

|-bgcolor=#fefefe
| 267301 ||  || — || September 19, 2001 || Socorro || LINEAR || NYS || align=right data-sort-value="0.93" | 930 m || 
|-id=302 bgcolor=#fefefe
| 267302 ||  || — || September 19, 2001 || Socorro || LINEAR || — || align=right | 1.2 km || 
|-id=303 bgcolor=#fefefe
| 267303 ||  || — || September 19, 2001 || Socorro || LINEAR || NYS || align=right data-sort-value="0.82" | 820 m || 
|-id=304 bgcolor=#fefefe
| 267304 ||  || — || September 19, 2001 || Socorro || LINEAR || NYS || align=right data-sort-value="0.74" | 740 m || 
|-id=305 bgcolor=#E9E9E9
| 267305 ||  || — || September 19, 2001 || Socorro || LINEAR || — || align=right data-sort-value="0.95" | 950 m || 
|-id=306 bgcolor=#fefefe
| 267306 ||  || — || September 19, 2001 || Socorro || LINEAR || — || align=right | 1.5 km || 
|-id=307 bgcolor=#fefefe
| 267307 ||  || — || September 19, 2001 || Socorro || LINEAR || — || align=right | 1.6 km || 
|-id=308 bgcolor=#E9E9E9
| 267308 ||  || — || September 19, 2001 || Socorro || LINEAR || — || align=right | 1.2 km || 
|-id=309 bgcolor=#fefefe
| 267309 ||  || — || September 20, 2001 || Socorro || LINEAR || — || align=right | 1.2 km || 
|-id=310 bgcolor=#E9E9E9
| 267310 ||  || — || October 10, 2001 || Palomar || NEAT || BRG || align=right | 1.4 km || 
|-id=311 bgcolor=#E9E9E9
| 267311 ||  || — || October 13, 2001 || Socorro || LINEAR || — || align=right | 1.1 km || 
|-id=312 bgcolor=#E9E9E9
| 267312 ||  || — || October 14, 2001 || Socorro || LINEAR || — || align=right | 1.1 km || 
|-id=313 bgcolor=#fefefe
| 267313 ||  || — || October 14, 2001 || Socorro || LINEAR || — || align=right | 1.3 km || 
|-id=314 bgcolor=#E9E9E9
| 267314 ||  || — || October 11, 2001 || Palomar || NEAT || — || align=right | 1.2 km || 
|-id=315 bgcolor=#E9E9E9
| 267315 ||  || — || October 15, 2001 || Socorro || LINEAR || — || align=right | 2.0 km || 
|-id=316 bgcolor=#E9E9E9
| 267316 ||  || — || October 13, 2001 || Socorro || LINEAR || — || align=right | 1.3 km || 
|-id=317 bgcolor=#E9E9E9
| 267317 ||  || — || October 13, 2001 || Palomar || NEAT || — || align=right | 1.6 km || 
|-id=318 bgcolor=#fefefe
| 267318 ||  || — || October 14, 2001 || Socorro || LINEAR || V || align=right | 1.1 km || 
|-id=319 bgcolor=#fefefe
| 267319 ||  || — || October 14, 2001 || Apache Point || SDSS || — || align=right | 1.2 km || 
|-id=320 bgcolor=#E9E9E9
| 267320 ||  || — || October 8, 2001 || Palomar || NEAT || — || align=right | 1.2 km || 
|-id=321 bgcolor=#fefefe
| 267321 ||  || — || October 17, 2001 || Socorro || LINEAR || H || align=right data-sort-value="0.97" | 970 m || 
|-id=322 bgcolor=#E9E9E9
| 267322 ||  || — || October 16, 2001 || Socorro || LINEAR || — || align=right | 1.2 km || 
|-id=323 bgcolor=#E9E9E9
| 267323 ||  || — || October 16, 2001 || Socorro || LINEAR || — || align=right | 2.1 km || 
|-id=324 bgcolor=#fefefe
| 267324 ||  || — || October 17, 2001 || Socorro || LINEAR || NYS || align=right data-sort-value="0.94" | 940 m || 
|-id=325 bgcolor=#E9E9E9
| 267325 ||  || — || October 17, 2001 || Socorro || LINEAR || IAN || align=right | 1.1 km || 
|-id=326 bgcolor=#E9E9E9
| 267326 ||  || — || October 17, 2001 || Socorro || LINEAR || — || align=right | 1.3 km || 
|-id=327 bgcolor=#fefefe
| 267327 ||  || — || October 21, 2001 || Kitt Peak || Spacewatch || — || align=right | 1.2 km || 
|-id=328 bgcolor=#E9E9E9
| 267328 ||  || — || October 20, 2001 || Socorro || LINEAR || — || align=right | 1.3 km || 
|-id=329 bgcolor=#fefefe
| 267329 ||  || — || October 22, 2001 || Socorro || LINEAR || NYS || align=right | 1.1 km || 
|-id=330 bgcolor=#E9E9E9
| 267330 ||  || — || October 21, 2001 || Socorro || LINEAR || — || align=right | 1.9 km || 
|-id=331 bgcolor=#E9E9E9
| 267331 ||  || — || October 23, 2001 || Socorro || LINEAR || — || align=right | 1.2 km || 
|-id=332 bgcolor=#fefefe
| 267332 ||  || — || October 16, 2001 || Socorro || LINEAR || NYS || align=right | 1.0 km || 
|-id=333 bgcolor=#E9E9E9
| 267333 ||  || — || October 18, 2001 || Palomar || NEAT || — || align=right | 1.1 km || 
|-id=334 bgcolor=#fefefe
| 267334 ||  || — || October 20, 2001 || Socorro || LINEAR || V || align=right data-sort-value="0.96" | 960 m || 
|-id=335 bgcolor=#E9E9E9
| 267335 ||  || — || October 23, 2001 || Socorro || LINEAR || — || align=right | 1.2 km || 
|-id=336 bgcolor=#E9E9E9
| 267336 ||  || — || October 24, 2001 || Palomar || NEAT || — || align=right | 1.1 km || 
|-id=337 bgcolor=#FFC2E0
| 267337 ||  || — || November 11, 2001 || Socorro || LINEAR || APO +1kmPHA || align=right data-sort-value="0.44" | 440 m || 
|-id=338 bgcolor=#E9E9E9
| 267338 ||  || — || November 9, 2001 || Socorro || LINEAR || EUN || align=right | 2.4 km || 
|-id=339 bgcolor=#E9E9E9
| 267339 ||  || — || November 10, 2001 || Socorro || LINEAR || — || align=right | 1.2 km || 
|-id=340 bgcolor=#d6d6d6
| 267340 ||  || — || November 12, 2001 || Socorro || LINEAR || — || align=right | 4.9 km || 
|-id=341 bgcolor=#E9E9E9
| 267341 ||  || — || November 15, 2001 || Socorro || LINEAR || JUN || align=right | 1.4 km || 
|-id=342 bgcolor=#E9E9E9
| 267342 ||  || — || November 12, 2001 || Socorro || LINEAR || — || align=right data-sort-value="0.99" | 990 m || 
|-id=343 bgcolor=#E9E9E9
| 267343 ||  || — || November 12, 2001 || Socorro || LINEAR || — || align=right | 1.6 km || 
|-id=344 bgcolor=#E9E9E9
| 267344 ||  || — || November 12, 2001 || Socorro || LINEAR || — || align=right | 2.8 km || 
|-id=345 bgcolor=#E9E9E9
| 267345 ||  || — || November 17, 2001 || Socorro || LINEAR || ADE || align=right | 2.2 km || 
|-id=346 bgcolor=#E9E9E9
| 267346 ||  || — || November 23, 2001 || Uccle || T. Pauwels || — || align=right | 1.4 km || 
|-id=347 bgcolor=#E9E9E9
| 267347 ||  || — || November 17, 2001 || Socorro || LINEAR || — || align=right | 1.1 km || 
|-id=348 bgcolor=#E9E9E9
| 267348 ||  || — || November 18, 2001 || Socorro || LINEAR || — || align=right | 1.5 km || 
|-id=349 bgcolor=#E9E9E9
| 267349 ||  || — || November 18, 2001 || Socorro || LINEAR || — || align=right data-sort-value="0.97" | 970 m || 
|-id=350 bgcolor=#E9E9E9
| 267350 ||  || — || November 18, 2001 || Socorro || LINEAR || — || align=right | 1.3 km || 
|-id=351 bgcolor=#E9E9E9
| 267351 ||  || — || November 19, 2001 || Socorro || LINEAR || — || align=right | 1.1 km || 
|-id=352 bgcolor=#E9E9E9
| 267352 ||  || — || November 20, 2001 || Socorro || LINEAR || — || align=right | 1.5 km || 
|-id=353 bgcolor=#E9E9E9
| 267353 ||  || — || November 21, 2001 || Socorro || LINEAR || — || align=right | 1.7 km || 
|-id=354 bgcolor=#E9E9E9
| 267354 ||  || — || November 21, 2001 || Socorro || LINEAR || — || align=right | 1.4 km || 
|-id=355 bgcolor=#E9E9E9
| 267355 ||  || — || December 3, 2001 || Socorro || LINEAR || — || align=right | 2.7 km || 
|-id=356 bgcolor=#E9E9E9
| 267356 ||  || — || December 7, 2001 || Socorro || LINEAR || — || align=right | 1.4 km || 
|-id=357 bgcolor=#E9E9E9
| 267357 ||  || — || December 9, 2001 || Socorro || LINEAR || — || align=right | 2.7 km || 
|-id=358 bgcolor=#E9E9E9
| 267358 ||  || — || December 9, 2001 || Socorro || LINEAR || HNS || align=right | 1.9 km || 
|-id=359 bgcolor=#E9E9E9
| 267359 ||  || — || December 9, 2001 || Socorro || LINEAR || ADE || align=right | 2.5 km || 
|-id=360 bgcolor=#fefefe
| 267360 ||  || — || December 9, 2001 || Socorro || LINEAR || — || align=right | 1.6 km || 
|-id=361 bgcolor=#E9E9E9
| 267361 ||  || — || December 9, 2001 || Socorro || LINEAR || — || align=right | 1.9 km || 
|-id=362 bgcolor=#E9E9E9
| 267362 ||  || — || December 9, 2001 || Socorro || LINEAR || — || align=right | 4.7 km || 
|-id=363 bgcolor=#E9E9E9
| 267363 ||  || — || December 10, 2001 || Socorro || LINEAR || — || align=right | 1.9 km || 
|-id=364 bgcolor=#E9E9E9
| 267364 ||  || — || December 10, 2001 || Socorro || LINEAR || — || align=right | 3.7 km || 
|-id=365 bgcolor=#E9E9E9
| 267365 ||  || — || December 11, 2001 || Socorro || LINEAR || — || align=right | 1.7 km || 
|-id=366 bgcolor=#E9E9E9
| 267366 ||  || — || December 11, 2001 || Socorro || LINEAR || — || align=right | 1.2 km || 
|-id=367 bgcolor=#E9E9E9
| 267367 ||  || — || December 10, 2001 || Socorro || LINEAR || — || align=right | 2.1 km || 
|-id=368 bgcolor=#E9E9E9
| 267368 ||  || — || December 10, 2001 || Socorro || LINEAR || — || align=right | 1.3 km || 
|-id=369 bgcolor=#E9E9E9
| 267369 ||  || — || December 10, 2001 || Socorro || LINEAR || RAF || align=right | 1.3 km || 
|-id=370 bgcolor=#E9E9E9
| 267370 ||  || — || December 14, 2001 || Kitt Peak || Spacewatch || — || align=right | 1.7 km || 
|-id=371 bgcolor=#E9E9E9
| 267371 ||  || — || December 13, 2001 || Socorro || LINEAR || — || align=right | 2.2 km || 
|-id=372 bgcolor=#E9E9E9
| 267372 ||  || — || December 14, 2001 || Socorro || LINEAR || — || align=right | 1.7 km || 
|-id=373 bgcolor=#E9E9E9
| 267373 ||  || — || December 14, 2001 || Socorro || LINEAR || — || align=right | 2.7 km || 
|-id=374 bgcolor=#E9E9E9
| 267374 ||  || — || December 14, 2001 || Socorro || LINEAR || — || align=right | 1.8 km || 
|-id=375 bgcolor=#E9E9E9
| 267375 ||  || — || December 14, 2001 || Socorro || LINEAR || — || align=right | 1.9 km || 
|-id=376 bgcolor=#E9E9E9
| 267376 ||  || — || December 14, 2001 || Socorro || LINEAR || — || align=right | 2.1 km || 
|-id=377 bgcolor=#E9E9E9
| 267377 ||  || — || December 14, 2001 || Socorro || LINEAR || HNS || align=right | 1.7 km || 
|-id=378 bgcolor=#E9E9E9
| 267378 ||  || — || December 14, 2001 || Socorro || LINEAR || JUN || align=right | 1.5 km || 
|-id=379 bgcolor=#E9E9E9
| 267379 ||  || — || December 15, 2001 || Socorro || LINEAR || — || align=right | 1.4 km || 
|-id=380 bgcolor=#E9E9E9
| 267380 ||  || — || December 15, 2001 || Socorro || LINEAR || — || align=right | 1.4 km || 
|-id=381 bgcolor=#E9E9E9
| 267381 ||  || — || December 15, 2001 || Socorro || LINEAR || — || align=right | 1.7 km || 
|-id=382 bgcolor=#E9E9E9
| 267382 ||  || — || December 15, 2001 || Socorro || LINEAR || — || align=right | 2.0 km || 
|-id=383 bgcolor=#E9E9E9
| 267383 ||  || — || December 15, 2001 || Socorro || LINEAR || — || align=right | 2.0 km || 
|-id=384 bgcolor=#E9E9E9
| 267384 ||  || — || December 15, 2001 || Socorro || LINEAR || — || align=right | 1.8 km || 
|-id=385 bgcolor=#fefefe
| 267385 ||  || — || December 15, 2001 || Socorro || LINEAR || — || align=right | 1.2 km || 
|-id=386 bgcolor=#E9E9E9
| 267386 ||  || — || December 15, 2001 || Socorro || LINEAR || — || align=right | 2.4 km || 
|-id=387 bgcolor=#E9E9E9
| 267387 ||  || — || December 15, 2001 || Socorro || LINEAR || — || align=right | 1.8 km || 
|-id=388 bgcolor=#d6d6d6
| 267388 ||  || — || December 17, 2001 || Socorro || LINEAR || EMA || align=right | 5.3 km || 
|-id=389 bgcolor=#E9E9E9
| 267389 ||  || — || December 18, 2001 || Socorro || LINEAR || — || align=right | 1.6 km || 
|-id=390 bgcolor=#E9E9E9
| 267390 ||  || — || December 18, 2001 || Socorro || LINEAR || — || align=right | 2.0 km || 
|-id=391 bgcolor=#E9E9E9
| 267391 ||  || — || December 18, 2001 || Palomar || NEAT || — || align=right | 3.3 km || 
|-id=392 bgcolor=#E9E9E9
| 267392 ||  || — || December 17, 2001 || Socorro || LINEAR || — || align=right | 1.6 km || 
|-id=393 bgcolor=#E9E9E9
| 267393 ||  || — || December 17, 2001 || Socorro || LINEAR || HNS || align=right | 1.6 km || 
|-id=394 bgcolor=#E9E9E9
| 267394 ||  || — || December 17, 2001 || Socorro || LINEAR || — || align=right | 3.1 km || 
|-id=395 bgcolor=#E9E9E9
| 267395 ||  || — || December 19, 2001 || Palomar || NEAT || — || align=right | 2.1 km || 
|-id=396 bgcolor=#E9E9E9
| 267396 ||  || — || December 18, 2001 || Apache Point || SDSS || MAR || align=right | 1.6 km || 
|-id=397 bgcolor=#E9E9E9
| 267397 ||  || — || January 5, 2002 || Haleakala || NEAT || JUN || align=right | 1.5 km || 
|-id=398 bgcolor=#E9E9E9
| 267398 ||  || — || January 6, 2002 || Palomar || NEAT || — || align=right | 1.6 km || 
|-id=399 bgcolor=#E9E9E9
| 267399 ||  || — || January 7, 2002 || Anderson Mesa || LONEOS || — || align=right | 2.7 km || 
|-id=400 bgcolor=#E9E9E9
| 267400 ||  || — || January 9, 2002 || Socorro || LINEAR || — || align=right | 2.8 km || 
|}

267401–267500 

|-bgcolor=#E9E9E9
| 267401 ||  || — || January 12, 2002 || Kitt Peak || Spacewatch || — || align=right | 1.4 km || 
|-id=402 bgcolor=#E9E9E9
| 267402 ||  || — || January 8, 2002 || Socorro || LINEAR || HNS || align=right | 1.8 km || 
|-id=403 bgcolor=#E9E9E9
| 267403 ||  || — || January 8, 2002 || Socorro || LINEAR || — || align=right | 1.7 km || 
|-id=404 bgcolor=#E9E9E9
| 267404 ||  || — || January 8, 2002 || Socorro || LINEAR || — || align=right | 2.4 km || 
|-id=405 bgcolor=#E9E9E9
| 267405 ||  || — || January 8, 2002 || Socorro || LINEAR || — || align=right | 1.9 km || 
|-id=406 bgcolor=#E9E9E9
| 267406 ||  || — || January 9, 2002 || Socorro || LINEAR || — || align=right | 1.4 km || 
|-id=407 bgcolor=#E9E9E9
| 267407 ||  || — || January 9, 2002 || Socorro || LINEAR || CLO || align=right | 2.7 km || 
|-id=408 bgcolor=#fefefe
| 267408 ||  || — || January 13, 2002 || Socorro || LINEAR || — || align=right | 1.2 km || 
|-id=409 bgcolor=#E9E9E9
| 267409 ||  || — || January 14, 2002 || Socorro || LINEAR || — || align=right | 1.9 km || 
|-id=410 bgcolor=#E9E9E9
| 267410 ||  || — || January 14, 2002 || Socorro || LINEAR || — || align=right | 2.4 km || 
|-id=411 bgcolor=#E9E9E9
| 267411 ||  || — || January 5, 2002 || Palomar || NEAT || JUN || align=right | 2.3 km || 
|-id=412 bgcolor=#E9E9E9
| 267412 ||  || — || January 14, 2002 || Palomar || NEAT || — || align=right | 2.6 km || 
|-id=413 bgcolor=#E9E9E9
| 267413 ||  || — || January 13, 2002 || Socorro || LINEAR || — || align=right | 1.9 km || 
|-id=414 bgcolor=#E9E9E9
| 267414 ||  || — || January 14, 2002 || Socorro || LINEAR || JUN || align=right | 1.2 km || 
|-id=415 bgcolor=#E9E9E9
| 267415 ||  || — || January 20, 2002 || Desert Eagle || W. K. Y. Yeung || — || align=right | 2.8 km || 
|-id=416 bgcolor=#E9E9E9
| 267416 ||  || — || January 21, 2002 || Desert Eagle || W. K. Y. Yeung || — || align=right | 1.9 km || 
|-id=417 bgcolor=#E9E9E9
| 267417 ||  || — || January 19, 2002 || Socorro || LINEAR || EUN || align=right | 1.7 km || 
|-id=418 bgcolor=#E9E9E9
| 267418 ||  || — || January 23, 2002 || Socorro || LINEAR || — || align=right | 3.3 km || 
|-id=419 bgcolor=#E9E9E9
| 267419 ||  || — || February 6, 2002 || Socorro || LINEAR || JUN || align=right | 1.6 km || 
|-id=420 bgcolor=#E9E9E9
| 267420 ||  || — || February 6, 2002 || Kitt Peak || Spacewatch || — || align=right | 1.8 km || 
|-id=421 bgcolor=#E9E9E9
| 267421 ||  || — || February 5, 2002 || Palomar || NEAT || — || align=right | 1.5 km || 
|-id=422 bgcolor=#E9E9E9
| 267422 ||  || — || February 7, 2002 || Socorro || LINEAR || MIS || align=right | 3.5 km || 
|-id=423 bgcolor=#E9E9E9
| 267423 ||  || — || February 7, 2002 || Palomar || NEAT || INO || align=right | 1.3 km || 
|-id=424 bgcolor=#E9E9E9
| 267424 ||  || — || February 12, 2002 || Desert Eagle || W. K. Y. Yeung || MAR || align=right | 1.5 km || 
|-id=425 bgcolor=#E9E9E9
| 267425 ||  || — || February 7, 2002 || Socorro || LINEAR || — || align=right | 4.0 km || 
|-id=426 bgcolor=#E9E9E9
| 267426 ||  || — || February 6, 2002 || Socorro || LINEAR || — || align=right | 3.1 km || 
|-id=427 bgcolor=#E9E9E9
| 267427 ||  || — || February 6, 2002 || Socorro || LINEAR || — || align=right | 2.6 km || 
|-id=428 bgcolor=#E9E9E9
| 267428 ||  || — || February 6, 2002 || Socorro || LINEAR || EUN || align=right | 2.0 km || 
|-id=429 bgcolor=#E9E9E9
| 267429 ||  || — || February 7, 2002 || Socorro || LINEAR || — || align=right | 2.3 km || 
|-id=430 bgcolor=#E9E9E9
| 267430 ||  || — || February 7, 2002 || Socorro || LINEAR || — || align=right | 1.8 km || 
|-id=431 bgcolor=#E9E9E9
| 267431 ||  || — || February 7, 2002 || Socorro || LINEAR || — || align=right | 1.8 km || 
|-id=432 bgcolor=#E9E9E9
| 267432 ||  || — || December 23, 2001 || Anderson Mesa || LONEOS || — || align=right | 3.2 km || 
|-id=433 bgcolor=#E9E9E9
| 267433 ||  || — || February 7, 2002 || Socorro || LINEAR || — || align=right | 2.5 km || 
|-id=434 bgcolor=#E9E9E9
| 267434 ||  || — || February 7, 2002 || Socorro || LINEAR || — || align=right | 2.9 km || 
|-id=435 bgcolor=#E9E9E9
| 267435 ||  || — || February 9, 2002 || Socorro || LINEAR || — || align=right | 2.6 km || 
|-id=436 bgcolor=#E9E9E9
| 267436 ||  || — || February 7, 2002 || Socorro || LINEAR || — || align=right | 1.7 km || 
|-id=437 bgcolor=#E9E9E9
| 267437 ||  || — || February 10, 2002 || Socorro || LINEAR || — || align=right | 2.0 km || 
|-id=438 bgcolor=#E9E9E9
| 267438 ||  || — || February 10, 2002 || Socorro || LINEAR || GEF || align=right | 1.5 km || 
|-id=439 bgcolor=#E9E9E9
| 267439 ||  || — || February 10, 2002 || Socorro || LINEAR || — || align=right | 2.5 km || 
|-id=440 bgcolor=#E9E9E9
| 267440 ||  || — || February 10, 2002 || Socorro || LINEAR || — || align=right | 1.8 km || 
|-id=441 bgcolor=#E9E9E9
| 267441 ||  || — || February 10, 2002 || Socorro || LINEAR || — || align=right | 3.2 km || 
|-id=442 bgcolor=#E9E9E9
| 267442 ||  || — || February 8, 2002 || Anderson Mesa || LONEOS || — || align=right | 5.5 km || 
|-id=443 bgcolor=#E9E9E9
| 267443 ||  || — || February 12, 2002 || Socorro || LINEAR || — || align=right | 2.6 km || 
|-id=444 bgcolor=#E9E9E9
| 267444 ||  || — || February 13, 2002 || Kitt Peak || Spacewatch || WIT || align=right | 1.6 km || 
|-id=445 bgcolor=#E9E9E9
| 267445 ||  || — || February 14, 2002 || Kitt Peak || Spacewatch || MRX || align=right | 1.2 km || 
|-id=446 bgcolor=#E9E9E9
| 267446 ||  || — || February 11, 2002 || Socorro || LINEAR || — || align=right | 1.7 km || 
|-id=447 bgcolor=#E9E9E9
| 267447 ||  || — || February 18, 2002 || Cima Ekar || ADAS || — || align=right | 2.1 km || 
|-id=448 bgcolor=#E9E9E9
| 267448 ||  || — || February 19, 2002 || Socorro || LINEAR || JUN || align=right | 1.6 km || 
|-id=449 bgcolor=#d6d6d6
| 267449 ||  || — || February 19, 2002 || Socorro || LINEAR || — || align=right | 8.8 km || 
|-id=450 bgcolor=#E9E9E9
| 267450 ||  || — || February 20, 2002 || Socorro || LINEAR || — || align=right | 2.6 km || 
|-id=451 bgcolor=#E9E9E9
| 267451 ||  || — || February 19, 2002 || Socorro || LINEAR || — || align=right | 3.8 km || 
|-id=452 bgcolor=#E9E9E9
| 267452 ||  || — || February 16, 2002 || Palomar || NEAT || — || align=right | 2.9 km || 
|-id=453 bgcolor=#E9E9E9
| 267453 ||  || — || February 21, 2002 || Socorro || LINEAR || — || align=right | 3.5 km || 
|-id=454 bgcolor=#E9E9E9
| 267454 ||  || — || March 5, 2002 || Haleakala || NEAT || — || align=right | 3.4 km || 
|-id=455 bgcolor=#E9E9E9
| 267455 ||  || — || March 10, 2002 || Palomar || NEAT || — || align=right | 3.5 km || 
|-id=456 bgcolor=#E9E9E9
| 267456 ||  || — || March 9, 2002 || Socorro || LINEAR || — || align=right | 2.3 km || 
|-id=457 bgcolor=#E9E9E9
| 267457 ||  || — || March 11, 2002 || Palomar || NEAT || AGN || align=right | 1.6 km || 
|-id=458 bgcolor=#E9E9E9
| 267458 ||  || — || March 13, 2002 || Socorro || LINEAR || GEF || align=right | 1.8 km || 
|-id=459 bgcolor=#E9E9E9
| 267459 ||  || — || March 13, 2002 || Socorro || LINEAR || GEF || align=right | 1.8 km || 
|-id=460 bgcolor=#E9E9E9
| 267460 ||  || — || March 13, 2002 || Socorro || LINEAR || — || align=right | 2.1 km || 
|-id=461 bgcolor=#E9E9E9
| 267461 ||  || — || March 14, 2002 || Socorro || LINEAR || — || align=right | 3.1 km || 
|-id=462 bgcolor=#E9E9E9
| 267462 ||  || — || March 13, 2002 || Socorro || LINEAR || — || align=right | 3.3 km || 
|-id=463 bgcolor=#E9E9E9
| 267463 ||  || — || March 5, 2002 || Palomar || NEAT || — || align=right | 2.3 km || 
|-id=464 bgcolor=#E9E9E9
| 267464 ||  || — || March 9, 2002 || Anderson Mesa || LONEOS || INO || align=right | 2.1 km || 
|-id=465 bgcolor=#E9E9E9
| 267465 ||  || — || March 10, 2002 || Kitt Peak || Spacewatch || PAD || align=right | 3.7 km || 
|-id=466 bgcolor=#E9E9E9
| 267466 ||  || — || March 12, 2002 || Anderson Mesa || LONEOS || — || align=right | 2.8 km || 
|-id=467 bgcolor=#E9E9E9
| 267467 ||  || — || March 12, 2002 || Palomar || NEAT || — || align=right | 2.6 km || 
|-id=468 bgcolor=#E9E9E9
| 267468 ||  || — || March 12, 2002 || Palomar || NEAT || — || align=right | 2.6 km || 
|-id=469 bgcolor=#E9E9E9
| 267469 ||  || — || March 13, 2002 || Palomar || NEAT || INO || align=right | 1.2 km || 
|-id=470 bgcolor=#E9E9E9
| 267470 ||  || — || March 19, 2002 || Socorro || LINEAR || — || align=right | 4.0 km || 
|-id=471 bgcolor=#E9E9E9
| 267471 ||  || — || March 19, 2002 || Socorro || LINEAR || — || align=right | 3.9 km || 
|-id=472 bgcolor=#E9E9E9
| 267472 ||  || — || March 19, 2002 || Haleakala || NEAT || — || align=right | 2.9 km || 
|-id=473 bgcolor=#E9E9E9
| 267473 ||  || — || March 19, 2002 || Palomar || NEAT || HNS || align=right | 1.8 km || 
|-id=474 bgcolor=#E9E9E9
| 267474 ||  || — || March 19, 2002 || Palomar || NEAT || INO || align=right | 1.8 km || 
|-id=475 bgcolor=#E9E9E9
| 267475 ||  || — || March 19, 2002 || Palomar || NEAT || HNA || align=right | 2.5 km || 
|-id=476 bgcolor=#E9E9E9
| 267476 ||  || — || April 15, 2002 || Desert Eagle || W. K. Y. Yeung || EUN || align=right | 2.1 km || 
|-id=477 bgcolor=#d6d6d6
| 267477 ||  || — || April 14, 2002 || Socorro || LINEAR || BRA || align=right | 2.3 km || 
|-id=478 bgcolor=#E9E9E9
| 267478 ||  || — || April 15, 2002 || Palomar || NEAT || — || align=right | 3.9 km || 
|-id=479 bgcolor=#E9E9E9
| 267479 ||  || — || April 7, 2002 || Cerro Tololo || M. W. Buie || GEF || align=right | 1.7 km || 
|-id=480 bgcolor=#E9E9E9
| 267480 ||  || — || April 2, 2002 || Kitt Peak || Spacewatch || AEO || align=right | 1.5 km || 
|-id=481 bgcolor=#E9E9E9
| 267481 ||  || — || April 4, 2002 || Palomar || NEAT || — || align=right | 3.3 km || 
|-id=482 bgcolor=#E9E9E9
| 267482 ||  || — || April 9, 2002 || Anderson Mesa || LONEOS || XIZ || align=right | 2.2 km || 
|-id=483 bgcolor=#E9E9E9
| 267483 ||  || — || April 9, 2002 || Kitt Peak || Spacewatch || — || align=right | 3.1 km || 
|-id=484 bgcolor=#E9E9E9
| 267484 ||  || — || April 10, 2002 || Socorro || LINEAR || — || align=right | 3.4 km || 
|-id=485 bgcolor=#E9E9E9
| 267485 ||  || — || April 12, 2002 || Socorro || LINEAR || — || align=right | 3.0 km || 
|-id=486 bgcolor=#E9E9E9
| 267486 ||  || — || April 12, 2002 || Palomar || NEAT || — || align=right | 3.8 km || 
|-id=487 bgcolor=#E9E9E9
| 267487 ||  || — || April 13, 2002 || Kitt Peak || Spacewatch || — || align=right | 2.9 km || 
|-id=488 bgcolor=#E9E9E9
| 267488 ||  || — || April 13, 2002 || Palomar || NEAT || — || align=right | 3.5 km || 
|-id=489 bgcolor=#E9E9E9
| 267489 ||  || — || April 14, 2002 || Palomar || NEAT || — || align=right | 2.5 km || 
|-id=490 bgcolor=#E9E9E9
| 267490 ||  || — || April 15, 2002 || Palomar || NEAT || — || align=right | 3.9 km || 
|-id=491 bgcolor=#d6d6d6
| 267491 ||  || — || December 1, 2005 || Kitt Peak || Spacewatch || — || align=right | 3.8 km || 
|-id=492 bgcolor=#E9E9E9
| 267492 ||  || — || April 16, 2002 || Socorro || LINEAR || — || align=right | 2.7 km || 
|-id=493 bgcolor=#E9E9E9
| 267493 ||  || — || May 3, 2002 || Anderson Mesa || LONEOS || INO || align=right | 1.5 km || 
|-id=494 bgcolor=#FFC2E0
| 267494 ||  || — || May 6, 2002 || Socorro || LINEAR || APO +1kmPHA || align=right | 2.2 km || 
|-id=495 bgcolor=#E9E9E9
| 267495 ||  || — || May 6, 2002 || Palomar || NEAT || — || align=right | 3.4 km || 
|-id=496 bgcolor=#E9E9E9
| 267496 ||  || — || May 11, 2002 || Socorro || LINEAR || MRX || align=right | 1.6 km || 
|-id=497 bgcolor=#E9E9E9
| 267497 ||  || — || May 5, 2002 || Palomar || NEAT || — || align=right | 4.0 km || 
|-id=498 bgcolor=#E9E9E9
| 267498 ||  || — || May 5, 2002 || Kitt Peak || Spacewatch || — || align=right | 5.3 km || 
|-id=499 bgcolor=#E9E9E9
| 267499 ||  || — || May 6, 2002 || Palomar || NEAT || GEF || align=right | 1.8 km || 
|-id=500 bgcolor=#E9E9E9
| 267500 ||  || — || May 6, 2002 || Palomar || NEAT || — || align=right | 2.5 km || 
|}

267501–267600 

|-bgcolor=#E9E9E9
| 267501 ||  || — || May 7, 2002 || Palomar || NEAT || GEF || align=right | 1.8 km || 
|-id=502 bgcolor=#E9E9E9
| 267502 ||  || — || May 13, 2002 || Palomar || NEAT || — || align=right | 4.1 km || 
|-id=503 bgcolor=#E9E9E9
| 267503 ||  || — || May 14, 2002 || Palomar || NEAT || — || align=right | 4.4 km || 
|-id=504 bgcolor=#FA8072
| 267504 ||  || — || May 16, 2002 || Haleakala || NEAT || — || align=right data-sort-value="0.98" | 980 m || 
|-id=505 bgcolor=#E9E9E9
| 267505 ||  || — || June 6, 2002 || Kitt Peak || Spacewatch || AGN || align=right | 2.2 km || 
|-id=506 bgcolor=#d6d6d6
| 267506 ||  || — || June 18, 2002 || Socorro || LINEAR || Tj (2.96) || align=right | 6.7 km || 
|-id=507 bgcolor=#d6d6d6
| 267507 ||  || — || July 8, 2002 || Palomar || NEAT || THM || align=right | 2.7 km || 
|-id=508 bgcolor=#d6d6d6
| 267508 ||  || — || July 1, 2002 || Palomar || NEAT || 7:4* || align=right | 4.9 km || 
|-id=509 bgcolor=#fefefe
| 267509 ||  || — || July 4, 2002 || Palomar || NEAT || — || align=right | 1.0 km || 
|-id=510 bgcolor=#fefefe
| 267510 ||  || — || July 5, 2002 || Socorro || LINEAR || — || align=right data-sort-value="0.82" | 820 m || 
|-id=511 bgcolor=#d6d6d6
| 267511 ||  || — || July 9, 2002 || Socorro || LINEAR || — || align=right | 5.3 km || 
|-id=512 bgcolor=#d6d6d6
| 267512 ||  || — || July 9, 2002 || Socorro || LINEAR || — || align=right | 3.8 km || 
|-id=513 bgcolor=#d6d6d6
| 267513 ||  || — || July 9, 2002 || Socorro || LINEAR || EOS || align=right | 2.8 km || 
|-id=514 bgcolor=#fefefe
| 267514 ||  || — || July 11, 2002 || Campo Imperatore || CINEOS || NYS || align=right data-sort-value="0.66" | 660 m || 
|-id=515 bgcolor=#d6d6d6
| 267515 ||  || — || July 14, 2002 || Palomar || NEAT || — || align=right | 4.1 km || 
|-id=516 bgcolor=#d6d6d6
| 267516 ||  || — || July 3, 2002 || Palomar || NEAT || — || align=right | 3.0 km || 
|-id=517 bgcolor=#fefefe
| 267517 ||  || — || July 9, 2002 || Palomar || NEAT || — || align=right | 1.0 km || 
|-id=518 bgcolor=#d6d6d6
| 267518 ||  || — || July 8, 2002 || Palomar || NEAT || EOS || align=right | 2.4 km || 
|-id=519 bgcolor=#d6d6d6
| 267519 ||  || — || July 8, 2002 || Palomar || NEAT || — || align=right | 3.3 km || 
|-id=520 bgcolor=#d6d6d6
| 267520 ||  || — || July 9, 2002 || Palomar || NEAT || — || align=right | 3.8 km || 
|-id=521 bgcolor=#d6d6d6
| 267521 ||  || — || April 16, 2001 || Kitt Peak || Spacewatch || EOS || align=right | 2.3 km || 
|-id=522 bgcolor=#d6d6d6
| 267522 ||  || — || July 18, 2002 || Socorro || LINEAR || — || align=right | 3.8 km || 
|-id=523 bgcolor=#FA8072
| 267523 ||  || — || July 18, 2002 || Socorro || LINEAR || — || align=right | 1.1 km || 
|-id=524 bgcolor=#d6d6d6
| 267524 ||  || — || July 22, 2002 || Palomar || NEAT || — || align=right | 3.0 km || 
|-id=525 bgcolor=#d6d6d6
| 267525 ||  || — || July 17, 2002 || Palomar || NEAT || — || align=right | 4.0 km || 
|-id=526 bgcolor=#d6d6d6
| 267526 ||  || — || August 5, 2002 || Palomar || NEAT || — || align=right | 4.4 km || 
|-id=527 bgcolor=#E9E9E9
| 267527 ||  || — || August 5, 2002 || Palomar || NEAT || — || align=right | 2.3 km || 
|-id=528 bgcolor=#fefefe
| 267528 ||  || — || August 6, 2002 || Palomar || NEAT || — || align=right data-sort-value="0.80" | 800 m || 
|-id=529 bgcolor=#d6d6d6
| 267529 ||  || — || August 6, 2002 || Palomar || NEAT || HYG || align=right | 3.6 km || 
|-id=530 bgcolor=#d6d6d6
| 267530 ||  || — || August 6, 2002 || Palomar || NEAT || THM || align=right | 3.2 km || 
|-id=531 bgcolor=#d6d6d6
| 267531 ||  || — || August 6, 2002 || Palomar || NEAT || — || align=right | 4.8 km || 
|-id=532 bgcolor=#fefefe
| 267532 ||  || — || August 10, 2002 || Socorro || LINEAR || FLO || align=right data-sort-value="0.94" | 940 m || 
|-id=533 bgcolor=#fefefe
| 267533 ||  || — || August 9, 2002 || Socorro || LINEAR || — || align=right | 1.3 km || 
|-id=534 bgcolor=#fefefe
| 267534 ||  || — || August 8, 2002 || Palomar || NEAT || — || align=right | 1.2 km || 
|-id=535 bgcolor=#d6d6d6
| 267535 ||  || — || August 6, 2002 || Palomar || NEAT || — || align=right | 4.3 km || 
|-id=536 bgcolor=#d6d6d6
| 267536 ||  || — || August 6, 2002 || Palomar || NEAT || — || align=right | 4.2 km || 
|-id=537 bgcolor=#E9E9E9
| 267537 ||  || — || August 10, 2002 || Socorro || LINEAR || GER || align=right | 3.0 km || 
|-id=538 bgcolor=#d6d6d6
| 267538 ||  || — || August 11, 2002 || Socorro || LINEAR || MEL || align=right | 5.9 km || 
|-id=539 bgcolor=#fefefe
| 267539 ||  || — || August 4, 2002 || Palomar || NEAT || PHO || align=right | 1.2 km || 
|-id=540 bgcolor=#d6d6d6
| 267540 ||  || — || August 11, 2002 || Haleakala || NEAT || — || align=right | 5.2 km || 
|-id=541 bgcolor=#d6d6d6
| 267541 ||  || — || August 13, 2002 || Kitt Peak || Spacewatch || — || align=right | 4.3 km || 
|-id=542 bgcolor=#d6d6d6
| 267542 ||  || — || August 13, 2002 || Anderson Mesa || LONEOS || URS || align=right | 5.1 km || 
|-id=543 bgcolor=#fefefe
| 267543 ||  || — || August 13, 2002 || Anderson Mesa || LONEOS || — || align=right data-sort-value="0.94" | 940 m || 
|-id=544 bgcolor=#fefefe
| 267544 ||  || — || August 14, 2002 || Socorro || LINEAR || — || align=right data-sort-value="0.99" | 990 m || 
|-id=545 bgcolor=#d6d6d6
| 267545 ||  || — || August 11, 2002 || Socorro || LINEAR || TIR || align=right | 5.0 km || 
|-id=546 bgcolor=#d6d6d6
| 267546 ||  || — || August 8, 2002 || Palomar || S. F. Hönig || EOS || align=right | 3.8 km || 
|-id=547 bgcolor=#d6d6d6
| 267547 ||  || — || August 8, 2002 || Palomar || S. F. Hönig || — || align=right | 4.1 km || 
|-id=548 bgcolor=#d6d6d6
| 267548 ||  || — || August 8, 2002 || Palomar || NEAT || EOS || align=right | 3.0 km || 
|-id=549 bgcolor=#d6d6d6
| 267549 ||  || — || August 8, 2002 || Palomar || NEAT || HYG || align=right | 3.3 km || 
|-id=550 bgcolor=#d6d6d6
| 267550 ||  || — || August 8, 2002 || Palomar || NEAT || — || align=right | 3.1 km || 
|-id=551 bgcolor=#d6d6d6
| 267551 ||  || — || August 15, 2002 || Palomar || NEAT || — || align=right | 3.3 km || 
|-id=552 bgcolor=#d6d6d6
| 267552 ||  || — || August 15, 2002 || Palomar || NEAT || — || align=right | 5.2 km || 
|-id=553 bgcolor=#d6d6d6
| 267553 ||  || — || August 7, 2002 || Palomar || NEAT || URS || align=right | 5.2 km || 
|-id=554 bgcolor=#fefefe
| 267554 ||  || — || August 15, 2002 || Palomar || NEAT || — || align=right data-sort-value="0.91" | 910 m || 
|-id=555 bgcolor=#d6d6d6
| 267555 ||  || — || August 15, 2002 || Palomar || NEAT || — || align=right | 4.3 km || 
|-id=556 bgcolor=#d6d6d6
| 267556 ||  || — || August 11, 2002 || Palomar || NEAT || — || align=right | 3.4 km || 
|-id=557 bgcolor=#d6d6d6
| 267557 ||  || — || August 11, 2002 || Palomar || NEAT || — || align=right | 4.3 km || 
|-id=558 bgcolor=#FA8072
| 267558 ||  || — || August 26, 2002 || Palomar || NEAT || H || align=right data-sort-value="0.87" | 870 m || 
|-id=559 bgcolor=#fefefe
| 267559 ||  || — || August 28, 2002 || Palomar || NEAT || NYS || align=right data-sort-value="0.86" | 860 m || 
|-id=560 bgcolor=#d6d6d6
| 267560 ||  || — || August 29, 2002 || Kitt Peak || Spacewatch || — || align=right | 3.4 km || 
|-id=561 bgcolor=#d6d6d6
| 267561 ||  || — || August 30, 2002 || Palomar || NEAT || — || align=right | 4.3 km || 
|-id=562 bgcolor=#d6d6d6
| 267562 ||  || — || August 30, 2002 || Palomar || NEAT || TIR || align=right | 4.6 km || 
|-id=563 bgcolor=#d6d6d6
| 267563 ||  || — || August 30, 2002 || Palomar || NEAT || ALA || align=right | 6.1 km || 
|-id=564 bgcolor=#d6d6d6
| 267564 ||  || — || August 29, 2002 || Palomar || S. F. Hönig || — || align=right | 4.4 km || 
|-id=565 bgcolor=#fefefe
| 267565 ||  || — || August 29, 2002 || Palomar || S. F. Hönig || — || align=right | 1.0 km || 
|-id=566 bgcolor=#fefefe
| 267566 ||  || — || August 29, 2002 || Palomar || S. F. Hönig || — || align=right data-sort-value="0.98" | 980 m || 
|-id=567 bgcolor=#fefefe
| 267567 ||  || — || August 29, 2002 || Palomar || S. F. Hönig || — || align=right data-sort-value="0.79" | 790 m || 
|-id=568 bgcolor=#d6d6d6
| 267568 ||  || — || August 27, 2002 || Palomar || NEAT || EOS || align=right | 2.5 km || 
|-id=569 bgcolor=#d6d6d6
| 267569 ||  || — || August 30, 2002 || Palomar || NEAT || EOS || align=right | 3.0 km || 
|-id=570 bgcolor=#d6d6d6
| 267570 ||  || — || August 16, 2002 || Haleakala || NEAT || — || align=right | 4.6 km || 
|-id=571 bgcolor=#d6d6d6
| 267571 ||  || — || August 30, 2002 || Palomar || NEAT || — || align=right | 5.3 km || 
|-id=572 bgcolor=#d6d6d6
| 267572 ||  || — || August 19, 2002 || Palomar || NEAT || — || align=right | 4.0 km || 
|-id=573 bgcolor=#d6d6d6
| 267573 ||  || — || August 29, 2002 || Palomar || NEAT || — || align=right | 3.1 km || 
|-id=574 bgcolor=#d6d6d6
| 267574 ||  || — || August 18, 2002 || Palomar || NEAT || — || align=right | 3.4 km || 
|-id=575 bgcolor=#d6d6d6
| 267575 ||  || — || August 20, 2002 || Palomar || NEAT || — || align=right | 4.4 km || 
|-id=576 bgcolor=#fefefe
| 267576 ||  || — || August 20, 2002 || Palomar || NEAT || — || align=right data-sort-value="0.73" | 730 m || 
|-id=577 bgcolor=#d6d6d6
| 267577 ||  || — || August 28, 2002 || Palomar || NEAT || — || align=right | 3.2 km || 
|-id=578 bgcolor=#d6d6d6
| 267578 ||  || — || August 19, 2002 || Palomar || NEAT || — || align=right | 5.2 km || 
|-id=579 bgcolor=#d6d6d6
| 267579 ||  || — || August 18, 2002 || Palomar || NEAT || — || align=right | 3.4 km || 
|-id=580 bgcolor=#d6d6d6
| 267580 ||  || — || August 17, 2002 || Palomar || NEAT || — || align=right | 3.5 km || 
|-id=581 bgcolor=#d6d6d6
| 267581 ||  || — || August 17, 2002 || Palomar || NEAT || — || align=right | 4.8 km || 
|-id=582 bgcolor=#d6d6d6
| 267582 ||  || — || August 26, 2002 || Palomar || NEAT || HYG || align=right | 2.9 km || 
|-id=583 bgcolor=#d6d6d6
| 267583 ||  || — || August 20, 2002 || Palomar || NEAT || — || align=right | 4.5 km || 
|-id=584 bgcolor=#fefefe
| 267584 ||  || — || August 28, 2002 || Palomar || NEAT || — || align=right data-sort-value="0.87" | 870 m || 
|-id=585 bgcolor=#fefefe
| 267585 Popluhár ||  ||  || August 17, 2002 || Palomar || NEAT || — || align=right data-sort-value="0.76" | 760 m || 
|-id=586 bgcolor=#d6d6d6
| 267586 ||  || — || August 17, 2002 || Palomar || NEAT || — || align=right | 3.1 km || 
|-id=587 bgcolor=#d6d6d6
| 267587 ||  || — || September 5, 2007 || Mount Lemmon || Mount Lemmon Survey || EUP || align=right | 5.1 km || 
|-id=588 bgcolor=#d6d6d6
| 267588 ||  || — || September 4, 2002 || Anderson Mesa || LONEOS || — || align=right | 4.8 km || 
|-id=589 bgcolor=#fefefe
| 267589 ||  || — || September 3, 2002 || Haleakala || NEAT || PHO || align=right | 1.5 km || 
|-id=590 bgcolor=#fefefe
| 267590 ||  || — || September 4, 2002 || Anderson Mesa || LONEOS || — || align=right | 1.9 km || 
|-id=591 bgcolor=#fefefe
| 267591 ||  || — || September 4, 2002 || Anderson Mesa || LONEOS || ERI || align=right | 2.3 km || 
|-id=592 bgcolor=#d6d6d6
| 267592 ||  || — || September 4, 2002 || Anderson Mesa || LONEOS || THM || align=right | 4.3 km || 
|-id=593 bgcolor=#d6d6d6
| 267593 ||  || — || September 5, 2002 || Anderson Mesa || LONEOS || URS || align=right | 5.7 km || 
|-id=594 bgcolor=#fefefe
| 267594 ||  || — || September 5, 2002 || Socorro || LINEAR || NYS || align=right | 2.0 km || 
|-id=595 bgcolor=#fefefe
| 267595 ||  || — || September 5, 2002 || Socorro || LINEAR || — || align=right | 1.0 km || 
|-id=596 bgcolor=#fefefe
| 267596 ||  || — || September 5, 2002 || Socorro || LINEAR || NYS || align=right data-sort-value="0.80" | 800 m || 
|-id=597 bgcolor=#d6d6d6
| 267597 ||  || — || September 5, 2002 || Socorro || LINEAR || — || align=right | 4.9 km || 
|-id=598 bgcolor=#fefefe
| 267598 ||  || — || September 5, 2002 || Socorro || LINEAR || FLO || align=right data-sort-value="0.86" | 860 m || 
|-id=599 bgcolor=#fefefe
| 267599 ||  || — || September 5, 2002 || Anderson Mesa || LONEOS || — || align=right data-sort-value="0.94" | 940 m || 
|-id=600 bgcolor=#d6d6d6
| 267600 ||  || — || September 4, 2002 || Anderson Mesa || LONEOS || — || align=right | 4.9 km || 
|}

267601–267700 

|-bgcolor=#d6d6d6
| 267601 ||  || — || September 4, 2002 || Palomar || NEAT || URS || align=right | 4.8 km || 
|-id=602 bgcolor=#d6d6d6
| 267602 ||  || — || September 5, 2002 || Socorro || LINEAR || — || align=right | 5.8 km || 
|-id=603 bgcolor=#fefefe
| 267603 ||  || — || September 5, 2002 || Socorro || LINEAR || FLO || align=right data-sort-value="0.74" | 740 m || 
|-id=604 bgcolor=#fefefe
| 267604 ||  || — || September 5, 2002 || Socorro || LINEAR || NYS || align=right data-sort-value="0.81" | 810 m || 
|-id=605 bgcolor=#fefefe
| 267605 ||  || — || September 5, 2002 || Socorro || LINEAR || — || align=right | 1.1 km || 
|-id=606 bgcolor=#fefefe
| 267606 ||  || — || September 5, 2002 || Socorro || LINEAR || — || align=right | 1.3 km || 
|-id=607 bgcolor=#fefefe
| 267607 ||  || — || September 5, 2002 || Socorro || LINEAR || — || align=right | 1.1 km || 
|-id=608 bgcolor=#fefefe
| 267608 ||  || — || September 6, 2002 || Socorro || LINEAR || V || align=right data-sort-value="0.95" | 950 m || 
|-id=609 bgcolor=#fefefe
| 267609 ||  || — || September 6, 2002 || Socorro || LINEAR || — || align=right | 1.2 km || 
|-id=610 bgcolor=#fefefe
| 267610 ||  || — || September 11, 2002 || Palomar || NEAT || ERI || align=right | 2.7 km || 
|-id=611 bgcolor=#d6d6d6
| 267611 ||  || — || September 11, 2002 || Palomar || NEAT || VER || align=right | 4.0 km || 
|-id=612 bgcolor=#d6d6d6
| 267612 ||  || — || September 11, 2002 || Palomar || NEAT || — || align=right | 3.9 km || 
|-id=613 bgcolor=#fefefe
| 267613 ||  || — || September 11, 2002 || Palomar || NEAT || — || align=right data-sort-value="0.82" | 820 m || 
|-id=614 bgcolor=#d6d6d6
| 267614 ||  || — || September 12, 2002 || Palomar || NEAT || — || align=right | 5.5 km || 
|-id=615 bgcolor=#fefefe
| 267615 ||  || — || September 12, 2002 || Palomar || NEAT || MAS || align=right data-sort-value="0.77" | 770 m || 
|-id=616 bgcolor=#fefefe
| 267616 ||  || — || September 13, 2002 || Anderson Mesa || LONEOS || — || align=right data-sort-value="0.99" | 990 m || 
|-id=617 bgcolor=#fefefe
| 267617 ||  || — || September 14, 2002 || Palomar || NEAT || — || align=right | 1.1 km || 
|-id=618 bgcolor=#d6d6d6
| 267618 ||  || — || September 12, 2002 || Palomar || NEAT || — || align=right | 4.3 km || 
|-id=619 bgcolor=#fefefe
| 267619 ||  || — || September 13, 2002 || Palomar || NEAT || — || align=right | 1.2 km || 
|-id=620 bgcolor=#d6d6d6
| 267620 ||  || — || September 14, 2002 || Palomar || NEAT || HYG || align=right | 3.6 km || 
|-id=621 bgcolor=#d6d6d6
| 267621 ||  || — || September 15, 2002 || Palomar || NEAT || — || align=right | 5.0 km || 
|-id=622 bgcolor=#fefefe
| 267622 ||  || — || September 15, 2002 || Haleakala || NEAT || — || align=right data-sort-value="0.94" | 940 m || 
|-id=623 bgcolor=#d6d6d6
| 267623 ||  || — || September 13, 2002 || Anderson Mesa || LONEOS || — || align=right | 5.1 km || 
|-id=624 bgcolor=#d6d6d6
| 267624 ||  || — || September 14, 2002 || Palomar || NEAT || ALA || align=right | 5.5 km || 
|-id=625 bgcolor=#d6d6d6
| 267625 ||  || — || September 11, 2002 || Wrightwood || J. W. Young || URS || align=right | 4.8 km || 
|-id=626 bgcolor=#d6d6d6
| 267626 ||  || — || September 15, 2002 || Palomar || R. Matson || — || align=right | 3.4 km || 
|-id=627 bgcolor=#d6d6d6
| 267627 ||  || — || September 1, 2002 || Palomar || NEAT || — || align=right | 4.6 km || 
|-id=628 bgcolor=#d6d6d6
| 267628 ||  || — || September 12, 2002 || Palomar || NEAT || — || align=right | 3.2 km || 
|-id=629 bgcolor=#fefefe
| 267629 ||  || — || September 13, 2002 || Palomar || NEAT || — || align=right data-sort-value="0.93" | 930 m || 
|-id=630 bgcolor=#fefefe
| 267630 ||  || — || September 1, 2002 || Palomar || NEAT || — || align=right data-sort-value="0.92" | 920 m || 
|-id=631 bgcolor=#fefefe
| 267631 ||  || — || September 4, 2002 || Palomar || NEAT || — || align=right | 1.1 km || 
|-id=632 bgcolor=#fefefe
| 267632 ||  || — || September 12, 2002 || Palomar || NEAT || FLO || align=right data-sort-value="0.68" | 680 m || 
|-id=633 bgcolor=#fefefe
| 267633 ||  || — || September 27, 2002 || Palomar || NEAT || — || align=right data-sort-value="0.91" | 910 m || 
|-id=634 bgcolor=#d6d6d6
| 267634 ||  || — || September 27, 2002 || Palomar || NEAT || — || align=right | 3.4 km || 
|-id=635 bgcolor=#fefefe
| 267635 ||  || — || September 27, 2002 || Palomar || NEAT || — || align=right data-sort-value="0.82" | 820 m || 
|-id=636 bgcolor=#fefefe
| 267636 ||  || — || September 26, 2002 || Palomar || NEAT || NYS || align=right data-sort-value="0.75" | 750 m || 
|-id=637 bgcolor=#d6d6d6
| 267637 ||  || — || September 26, 2002 || Palomar || NEAT || — || align=right | 4.6 km || 
|-id=638 bgcolor=#fefefe
| 267638 ||  || — || September 28, 2002 || Palomar || NEAT || — || align=right | 1.2 km || 
|-id=639 bgcolor=#fefefe
| 267639 ||  || — || September 29, 2002 || Haleakala || NEAT || FLO || align=right data-sort-value="0.81" | 810 m || 
|-id=640 bgcolor=#fefefe
| 267640 ||  || — || September 28, 2002 || Palomar || NEAT || MAS || align=right data-sort-value="0.85" | 850 m || 
|-id=641 bgcolor=#fefefe
| 267641 ||  || — || September 29, 2002 || Haleakala || NEAT || — || align=right data-sort-value="0.97" | 970 m || 
|-id=642 bgcolor=#fefefe
| 267642 ||  || — || September 29, 2002 || Kitt Peak || Spacewatch || NYS || align=right data-sort-value="0.93" | 930 m || 
|-id=643 bgcolor=#fefefe
| 267643 ||  || — || September 16, 2002 || Palomar || NEAT || — || align=right data-sort-value="0.98" | 980 m || 
|-id=644 bgcolor=#d6d6d6
| 267644 ||  || — || September 16, 2002 || Palomar || NEAT || — || align=right | 3.1 km || 
|-id=645 bgcolor=#fefefe
| 267645 ||  || — || September 17, 2002 || Palomar || NEAT || — || align=right | 1.1 km || 
|-id=646 bgcolor=#d6d6d6
| 267646 ||  || — || September 16, 2002 || Palomar || NEAT || — || align=right | 4.6 km || 
|-id=647 bgcolor=#d6d6d6
| 267647 ||  || — || October 1, 2002 || Anderson Mesa || LONEOS || — || align=right | 5.6 km || 
|-id=648 bgcolor=#fefefe
| 267648 ||  || — || October 1, 2002 || Socorro || LINEAR || ERI || align=right | 2.9 km || 
|-id=649 bgcolor=#d6d6d6
| 267649 ||  || — || October 1, 2002 || Haleakala || NEAT || HYG || align=right | 4.2 km || 
|-id=650 bgcolor=#fefefe
| 267650 ||  || — || October 2, 2002 || Socorro || LINEAR || NYS || align=right data-sort-value="0.81" | 810 m || 
|-id=651 bgcolor=#fefefe
| 267651 ||  || — || October 2, 2002 || Socorro || LINEAR || MAS || align=right data-sort-value="0.82" | 820 m || 
|-id=652 bgcolor=#fefefe
| 267652 ||  || — || October 2, 2002 || Socorro || LINEAR || — || align=right | 1.1 km || 
|-id=653 bgcolor=#fefefe
| 267653 ||  || — || October 3, 2002 || Socorro || LINEAR || MAS || align=right data-sort-value="0.84" | 840 m || 
|-id=654 bgcolor=#fefefe
| 267654 ||  || — || October 3, 2002 || Campo Imperatore || CINEOS || FLO || align=right data-sort-value="0.92" | 920 m || 
|-id=655 bgcolor=#fefefe
| 267655 ||  || — || October 5, 2002 || Palomar || NEAT || — || align=right | 1.4 km || 
|-id=656 bgcolor=#FA8072
| 267656 ||  || — || October 4, 2002 || Socorro || LINEAR || H || align=right data-sort-value="0.74" | 740 m || 
|-id=657 bgcolor=#fefefe
| 267657 ||  || — || October 3, 2002 || Palomar || NEAT || V || align=right data-sort-value="0.96" | 960 m || 
|-id=658 bgcolor=#d6d6d6
| 267658 ||  || — || October 3, 2002 || Socorro || LINEAR || URS || align=right | 5.6 km || 
|-id=659 bgcolor=#d6d6d6
| 267659 ||  || — || October 3, 2002 || Socorro || LINEAR || — || align=right | 3.5 km || 
|-id=660 bgcolor=#d6d6d6
| 267660 ||  || — || October 4, 2002 || Palomar || NEAT || — || align=right | 4.8 km || 
|-id=661 bgcolor=#fefefe
| 267661 ||  || — || October 4, 2002 || Socorro || LINEAR || — || align=right | 1.2 km || 
|-id=662 bgcolor=#d6d6d6
| 267662 ||  || — || October 4, 2002 || Anderson Mesa || LONEOS || TIR || align=right | 4.8 km || 
|-id=663 bgcolor=#fefefe
| 267663 ||  || — || October 3, 2002 || Socorro || LINEAR || — || align=right | 1.2 km || 
|-id=664 bgcolor=#fefefe
| 267664 ||  || — || October 4, 2002 || Socorro || LINEAR || — || align=right | 1.1 km || 
|-id=665 bgcolor=#fefefe
| 267665 ||  || — || October 7, 2002 || Socorro || LINEAR || V || align=right data-sort-value="0.62" | 620 m || 
|-id=666 bgcolor=#fefefe
| 267666 ||  || — || October 7, 2002 || Socorro || LINEAR || FLO || align=right data-sort-value="0.80" | 800 m || 
|-id=667 bgcolor=#fefefe
| 267667 ||  || — || October 9, 2002 || Socorro || LINEAR || — || align=right | 1.2 km || 
|-id=668 bgcolor=#fefefe
| 267668 ||  || — || October 10, 2002 || Palomar || NEAT || PHO || align=right | 3.3 km || 
|-id=669 bgcolor=#fefefe
| 267669 ||  || — || October 9, 2002 || Socorro || LINEAR || NYS || align=right data-sort-value="0.94" | 940 m || 
|-id=670 bgcolor=#fefefe
| 267670 ||  || — || October 9, 2002 || Socorro || LINEAR || — || align=right | 1.2 km || 
|-id=671 bgcolor=#FA8072
| 267671 ||  || — || October 10, 2002 || Socorro || LINEAR || — || align=right | 1.3 km || 
|-id=672 bgcolor=#fefefe
| 267672 ||  || — || October 4, 2002 || Apache Point || SDSS || V || align=right data-sort-value="0.75" | 750 m || 
|-id=673 bgcolor=#fefefe
| 267673 ||  || — || October 4, 2002 || Apache Point || SDSS || V || align=right data-sort-value="0.81" | 810 m || 
|-id=674 bgcolor=#d6d6d6
| 267674 ||  || — || October 4, 2002 || Apache Point || SDSS || EOS || align=right | 2.6 km || 
|-id=675 bgcolor=#fefefe
| 267675 ||  || — || October 5, 2002 || Apache Point || SDSS || FLO || align=right data-sort-value="0.67" | 670 m || 
|-id=676 bgcolor=#d6d6d6
| 267676 ||  || — || October 5, 2002 || Apache Point || SDSS || — || align=right | 4.4 km || 
|-id=677 bgcolor=#d6d6d6
| 267677 ||  || — || October 3, 2002 || Palomar || NEAT || — || align=right | 4.6 km || 
|-id=678 bgcolor=#FA8072
| 267678 ||  || — || October 28, 2002 || Socorro || LINEAR || H || align=right data-sort-value="0.88" | 880 m || 
|-id=679 bgcolor=#fefefe
| 267679 ||  || — || October 28, 2002 || Palomar || NEAT || — || align=right | 2.7 km || 
|-id=680 bgcolor=#fefefe
| 267680 ||  || — || October 28, 2002 || Palomar || NEAT || NYS || align=right data-sort-value="0.87" | 870 m || 
|-id=681 bgcolor=#fefefe
| 267681 ||  || — || October 30, 2002 || Kitt Peak || Spacewatch || MAS || align=right data-sort-value="0.77" | 770 m || 
|-id=682 bgcolor=#fefefe
| 267682 ||  || — || October 28, 2002 || Haleakala || NEAT || — || align=right | 1.2 km || 
|-id=683 bgcolor=#fefefe
| 267683 ||  || — || October 29, 2002 || Kitt Peak || Spacewatch || FLO || align=right data-sort-value="0.92" | 920 m || 
|-id=684 bgcolor=#fefefe
| 267684 ||  || — || October 30, 2002 || Kitt Peak || Spacewatch || — || align=right data-sort-value="0.93" | 930 m || 
|-id=685 bgcolor=#fefefe
| 267685 ||  || — || October 31, 2002 || Palomar || NEAT || NYS || align=right data-sort-value="0.81" | 810 m || 
|-id=686 bgcolor=#fefefe
| 267686 ||  || — || November 4, 2002 || Palomar || NEAT || — || align=right data-sort-value="0.97" | 970 m || 
|-id=687 bgcolor=#fefefe
| 267687 ||  || — || November 5, 2002 || Socorro || LINEAR || V || align=right data-sort-value="0.92" | 920 m || 
|-id=688 bgcolor=#fefefe
| 267688 ||  || — || November 4, 2002 || Palomar || NEAT || — || align=right | 1.3 km || 
|-id=689 bgcolor=#fefefe
| 267689 ||  || — || November 7, 2002 || Socorro || LINEAR || NYS || align=right data-sort-value="0.80" | 800 m || 
|-id=690 bgcolor=#fefefe
| 267690 ||  || — || November 11, 2002 || Socorro || LINEAR || NYS || align=right data-sort-value="0.85" | 850 m || 
|-id=691 bgcolor=#fefefe
| 267691 ||  || — || November 12, 2002 || Socorro || LINEAR || — || align=right | 1.0 km || 
|-id=692 bgcolor=#fefefe
| 267692 ||  || — || November 13, 2002 || Palomar || NEAT || NYS || align=right | 1.1 km || 
|-id=693 bgcolor=#fefefe
| 267693 ||  || — || November 7, 2002 || Socorro || LINEAR || NYS || align=right data-sort-value="0.98" | 980 m || 
|-id=694 bgcolor=#fefefe
| 267694 ||  || — || November 25, 2002 || Palomar || NEAT || V || align=right data-sort-value="0.92" | 920 m || 
|-id=695 bgcolor=#fefefe
| 267695 ||  || — || November 24, 2002 || Palomar || NEAT || V || align=right data-sort-value="0.92" | 920 m || 
|-id=696 bgcolor=#fefefe
| 267696 ||  || — || December 2, 2002 || Socorro || LINEAR || — || align=right | 1.1 km || 
|-id=697 bgcolor=#fefefe
| 267697 ||  || — || December 6, 2002 || Socorro || LINEAR || — || align=right | 1.5 km || 
|-id=698 bgcolor=#E9E9E9
| 267698 ||  || — || December 6, 2002 || Socorro || LINEAR || — || align=right | 1.7 km || 
|-id=699 bgcolor=#fefefe
| 267699 ||  || — || December 12, 2002 || Palomar || NEAT || V || align=right data-sort-value="0.82" | 820 m || 
|-id=700 bgcolor=#E9E9E9
| 267700 ||  || — || December 11, 2002 || Socorro || LINEAR || — || align=right | 1.6 km || 
|}

267701–267800 

|-bgcolor=#E9E9E9
| 267701 ||  || — || December 5, 2002 || Socorro || LINEAR || — || align=right | 1.4 km || 
|-id=702 bgcolor=#fefefe
| 267702 ||  || — || December 6, 2002 || Socorro || LINEAR || — || align=right data-sort-value="0.99" | 990 m || 
|-id=703 bgcolor=#fefefe
| 267703 ||  || — || December 10, 2002 || Palomar || NEAT || — || align=right | 1.1 km || 
|-id=704 bgcolor=#E9E9E9
| 267704 ||  || — || December 31, 2002 || Socorro || LINEAR || — || align=right | 1.4 km || 
|-id=705 bgcolor=#fefefe
| 267705 ||  || — || January 7, 2003 || Socorro || LINEAR || H || align=right data-sort-value="0.80" | 800 m || 
|-id=706 bgcolor=#fefefe
| 267706 ||  || — || January 7, 2003 || Socorro || LINEAR || — || align=right | 1.4 km || 
|-id=707 bgcolor=#fefefe
| 267707 ||  || — || January 7, 2003 || Socorro || LINEAR || H || align=right | 1.1 km || 
|-id=708 bgcolor=#E9E9E9
| 267708 ||  || — || January 5, 2003 || Socorro || LINEAR || — || align=right | 1.4 km || 
|-id=709 bgcolor=#fefefe
| 267709 ||  || — || January 5, 2003 || Socorro || LINEAR || — || align=right | 1.2 km || 
|-id=710 bgcolor=#fefefe
| 267710 ||  || — || January 5, 2003 || Socorro || LINEAR || H || align=right data-sort-value="0.90" | 900 m || 
|-id=711 bgcolor=#d6d6d6
| 267711 ||  || — || January 5, 2003 || Socorro || LINEAR || — || align=right | 5.0 km || 
|-id=712 bgcolor=#E9E9E9
| 267712 ||  || — || January 26, 2003 || Anderson Mesa || LONEOS || EUN || align=right | 1.7 km || 
|-id=713 bgcolor=#fefefe
| 267713 ||  || — || January 26, 2003 || Anderson Mesa || LONEOS || — || align=right | 1.7 km || 
|-id=714 bgcolor=#d6d6d6
| 267714 ||  || — || January 26, 2003 || Haleakala || NEAT || 3:2 || align=right | 5.8 km || 
|-id=715 bgcolor=#E9E9E9
| 267715 ||  || — || January 26, 2003 || Kitt Peak || Spacewatch || RAF || align=right | 1.2 km || 
|-id=716 bgcolor=#fefefe
| 267716 ||  || — || January 29, 2003 || Kitt Peak || Spacewatch || H || align=right data-sort-value="0.72" | 720 m || 
|-id=717 bgcolor=#d6d6d6
| 267717 ||  || — || January 31, 2003 || Socorro || LINEAR || 3:2 || align=right | 7.1 km || 
|-id=718 bgcolor=#E9E9E9
| 267718 ||  || — || January 27, 2003 || Haleakala || NEAT || — || align=right | 1.2 km || 
|-id=719 bgcolor=#d6d6d6
| 267719 ||  || — || January 24, 2003 || Palomar || NEAT || 3:2 || align=right | 5.0 km || 
|-id=720 bgcolor=#FFC2E0
| 267720 ||  || — || February 1, 2003 || Socorro || LINEAR || APOPHA || align=right data-sort-value="0.59" | 590 m || 
|-id=721 bgcolor=#fefefe
| 267721 ||  || — || February 4, 2003 || Socorro || LINEAR || H || align=right data-sort-value="0.82" | 820 m || 
|-id=722 bgcolor=#fefefe
| 267722 ||  || — || February 26, 2003 || Socorro || LINEAR || H || align=right data-sort-value="0.96" | 960 m || 
|-id=723 bgcolor=#E9E9E9
| 267723 ||  || — || March 6, 2003 || Socorro || LINEAR || — || align=right | 1.9 km || 
|-id=724 bgcolor=#E9E9E9
| 267724 ||  || — || March 6, 2003 || Socorro || LINEAR || — || align=right | 1.5 km || 
|-id=725 bgcolor=#E9E9E9
| 267725 ||  || — || March 6, 2003 || Cima Ekar || ADAS || — || align=right | 1.7 km || 
|-id=726 bgcolor=#E9E9E9
| 267726 ||  || — || March 9, 2003 || Anderson Mesa || LONEOS || MIT || align=right | 4.0 km || 
|-id=727 bgcolor=#fefefe
| 267727 ||  || — || March 12, 2003 || Socorro || LINEAR || — || align=right | 2.6 km || 
|-id=728 bgcolor=#E9E9E9
| 267728 ||  || — || March 12, 2003 || Socorro || LINEAR || — || align=right | 3.3 km || 
|-id=729 bgcolor=#FFC2E0
| 267729 ||  || — || March 27, 2003 || Socorro || LINEAR || APOPHAslow || align=right data-sort-value="0.77" | 770 m || 
|-id=730 bgcolor=#fefefe
| 267730 ||  || — || March 29, 2003 || Anderson Mesa || LONEOS || H || align=right data-sort-value="0.83" | 830 m || 
|-id=731 bgcolor=#E9E9E9
| 267731 ||  || — || March 24, 2003 || Kitt Peak || Spacewatch || — || align=right | 1.3 km || 
|-id=732 bgcolor=#E9E9E9
| 267732 ||  || — || March 23, 2003 || Kitt Peak || Spacewatch || — || align=right | 1.9 km || 
|-id=733 bgcolor=#E9E9E9
| 267733 ||  || — || March 26, 2003 || Palomar || NEAT || — || align=right | 1.4 km || 
|-id=734 bgcolor=#E9E9E9
| 267734 ||  || — || March 26, 2003 || Kitt Peak || Spacewatch || — || align=right | 1.3 km || 
|-id=735 bgcolor=#E9E9E9
| 267735 ||  || — || March 26, 2003 || Palomar || NEAT || — || align=right | 1.0 km || 
|-id=736 bgcolor=#E9E9E9
| 267736 ||  || — || March 27, 2003 || Catalina || CSS || BRG || align=right | 1.8 km || 
|-id=737 bgcolor=#E9E9E9
| 267737 ||  || — || March 29, 2003 || Anderson Mesa || LONEOS || — || align=right | 2.3 km || 
|-id=738 bgcolor=#E9E9E9
| 267738 ||  || — || March 29, 2003 || Anderson Mesa || LONEOS || — || align=right | 1.4 km || 
|-id=739 bgcolor=#E9E9E9
| 267739 ||  || — || March 25, 2003 || Kitt Peak || Spacewatch || — || align=right | 1.4 km || 
|-id=740 bgcolor=#E9E9E9
| 267740 ||  || — || March 26, 2003 || Palomar || NEAT || — || align=right | 1.5 km || 
|-id=741 bgcolor=#E9E9E9
| 267741 ||  || — || March 31, 2003 || Anderson Mesa || LONEOS || — || align=right | 1.3 km || 
|-id=742 bgcolor=#E9E9E9
| 267742 ||  || — || March 31, 2003 || Kitt Peak || Spacewatch || RAF || align=right | 1.4 km || 
|-id=743 bgcolor=#E9E9E9
| 267743 ||  || — || March 25, 2003 || Palomar || NEAT || — || align=right | 1.3 km || 
|-id=744 bgcolor=#E9E9E9
| 267744 ||  || — || April 4, 2003 || Kitt Peak || Spacewatch || — || align=right | 1.5 km || 
|-id=745 bgcolor=#E9E9E9
| 267745 ||  || — || April 5, 2003 || Anderson Mesa || LONEOS || — || align=right | 5.7 km || 
|-id=746 bgcolor=#E9E9E9
| 267746 ||  || — || April 5, 2003 || Anderson Mesa || LONEOS || MIT || align=right | 3.9 km || 
|-id=747 bgcolor=#E9E9E9
| 267747 ||  || — || April 7, 2003 || Kitt Peak || Spacewatch || — || align=right | 1.4 km || 
|-id=748 bgcolor=#E9E9E9
| 267748 ||  || — || April 8, 2003 || Haleakala || NEAT || — || align=right | 1.4 km || 
|-id=749 bgcolor=#E9E9E9
| 267749 ||  || — || April 25, 2003 || Anderson Mesa || LONEOS || — || align=right | 1.9 km || 
|-id=750 bgcolor=#E9E9E9
| 267750 ||  || — || April 24, 2003 || Anderson Mesa || LONEOS || — || align=right | 1.6 km || 
|-id=751 bgcolor=#E9E9E9
| 267751 ||  || — || April 26, 2003 || Kitt Peak || Spacewatch || — || align=right | 1.7 km || 
|-id=752 bgcolor=#E9E9E9
| 267752 ||  || — || May 1, 2003 || Socorro || LINEAR || BRG || align=right | 1.9 km || 
|-id=753 bgcolor=#E9E9E9
| 267753 ||  || — || May 9, 2003 || Socorro || LINEAR || — || align=right | 3.4 km || 
|-id=754 bgcolor=#E9E9E9
| 267754 ||  || — || May 26, 2003 || Haleakala || NEAT || — || align=right | 4.2 km || 
|-id=755 bgcolor=#E9E9E9
| 267755 ||  || — || May 27, 2003 || Kitt Peak || Spacewatch || PAD || align=right | 2.2 km || 
|-id=756 bgcolor=#E9E9E9
| 267756 ||  || — || June 2, 2003 || Kitt Peak || Spacewatch || JUN || align=right | 1.5 km || 
|-id=757 bgcolor=#E9E9E9
| 267757 ||  || — || June 4, 2003 || Kitt Peak || Spacewatch || — || align=right | 1.9 km || 
|-id=758 bgcolor=#E9E9E9
| 267758 ||  || — || June 22, 2003 || Socorro || LINEAR || — || align=right | 1.5 km || 
|-id=759 bgcolor=#FFC2E0
| 267759 ||  || — || June 28, 2003 || Anderson Mesa || LONEOS || AMO || align=right data-sort-value="0.59" | 590 m || 
|-id=760 bgcolor=#d6d6d6
| 267760 ||  || — || July 3, 2003 || Kitt Peak || Spacewatch || — || align=right | 3.2 km || 
|-id=761 bgcolor=#E9E9E9
| 267761 ||  || — || July 26, 2003 || Palomar || NEAT || — || align=right | 3.1 km || 
|-id=762 bgcolor=#E9E9E9
| 267762 ||  || — || August 4, 2003 || Socorro || LINEAR || HNA || align=right | 2.9 km || 
|-id=763 bgcolor=#d6d6d6
| 267763 ||  || — || August 22, 2003 || Socorro || LINEAR || — || align=right | 3.2 km || 
|-id=764 bgcolor=#E9E9E9
| 267764 ||  || — || August 23, 2003 || Črni Vrh || Črni Vrh || GAL || align=right | 2.2 km || 
|-id=765 bgcolor=#d6d6d6
| 267765 ||  || — || August 23, 2003 || Socorro || LINEAR || — || align=right | 4.1 km || 
|-id=766 bgcolor=#E9E9E9
| 267766 ||  || — || August 28, 2003 || Haleakala || NEAT || — || align=right | 3.2 km || 
|-id=767 bgcolor=#E9E9E9
| 267767 ||  || — || September 3, 2003 || Wrightwood || J. W. Young, A. Grigsby || GEF || align=right | 1.7 km || 
|-id=768 bgcolor=#d6d6d6
| 267768 ||  || — || September 15, 2003 || Anderson Mesa || LONEOS || KOR || align=right | 2.6 km || 
|-id=769 bgcolor=#d6d6d6
| 267769 ||  || — || September 17, 2003 || Kitt Peak || Spacewatch || TIR || align=right | 2.1 km || 
|-id=770 bgcolor=#d6d6d6
| 267770 ||  || — || September 16, 2003 || Haleakala || NEAT || — || align=right | 4.9 km || 
|-id=771 bgcolor=#d6d6d6
| 267771 ||  || — || September 16, 2003 || Palomar || NEAT || — || align=right | 5.8 km || 
|-id=772 bgcolor=#d6d6d6
| 267772 ||  || — || September 17, 2003 || Kitt Peak || Spacewatch || KOR || align=right | 2.6 km || 
|-id=773 bgcolor=#d6d6d6
| 267773 ||  || — || September 18, 2003 || Kitt Peak || Spacewatch || CHA || align=right | 4.7 km || 
|-id=774 bgcolor=#d6d6d6
| 267774 ||  || — || September 17, 2003 || Kitt Peak || Spacewatch || — || align=right | 5.0 km || 
|-id=775 bgcolor=#d6d6d6
| 267775 ||  || — || September 17, 2003 || Kitt Peak || Spacewatch || EUP || align=right | 4.8 km || 
|-id=776 bgcolor=#d6d6d6
| 267776 ||  || — || September 17, 2003 || Socorro || LINEAR || — || align=right | 3.7 km || 
|-id=777 bgcolor=#d6d6d6
| 267777 ||  || — || September 18, 2003 || Palomar || NEAT || — || align=right | 4.5 km || 
|-id=778 bgcolor=#d6d6d6
| 267778 ||  || — || September 18, 2003 || Palomar || NEAT || EOS || align=right | 2.7 km || 
|-id=779 bgcolor=#d6d6d6
| 267779 ||  || — || September 20, 2003 || Haleakala || NEAT || — || align=right | 3.5 km || 
|-id=780 bgcolor=#d6d6d6
| 267780 ||  || — || September 17, 2003 || Kitt Peak || Spacewatch || HYG || align=right | 2.7 km || 
|-id=781 bgcolor=#d6d6d6
| 267781 ||  || — || September 18, 2003 || Socorro || LINEAR || — || align=right | 3.6 km || 
|-id=782 bgcolor=#fefefe
| 267782 ||  || — || September 19, 2003 || Anderson Mesa || LONEOS || — || align=right data-sort-value="0.76" | 760 m || 
|-id=783 bgcolor=#d6d6d6
| 267783 ||  || — || September 17, 2003 || Kitt Peak || Spacewatch || — || align=right | 3.3 km || 
|-id=784 bgcolor=#d6d6d6
| 267784 ||  || — || September 18, 2003 || Kitt Peak || Spacewatch || — || align=right | 4.3 km || 
|-id=785 bgcolor=#d6d6d6
| 267785 ||  || — || September 19, 2003 || Socorro || LINEAR || EOS || align=right | 2.8 km || 
|-id=786 bgcolor=#d6d6d6
| 267786 ||  || — || September 23, 2003 || Haleakala || NEAT || SAN || align=right | 2.7 km || 
|-id=787 bgcolor=#d6d6d6
| 267787 ||  || — || September 20, 2003 || Campo Imperatore || CINEOS || — || align=right | 4.1 km || 
|-id=788 bgcolor=#d6d6d6
| 267788 ||  || — || September 22, 2003 || Anderson Mesa || LONEOS || — || align=right | 3.6 km || 
|-id=789 bgcolor=#d6d6d6
| 267789 ||  || — || September 18, 2003 || Palomar || NEAT || — || align=right | 3.3 km || 
|-id=790 bgcolor=#d6d6d6
| 267790 ||  || — || September 22, 2003 || Anderson Mesa || LONEOS || — || align=right | 5.0 km || 
|-id=791 bgcolor=#d6d6d6
| 267791 ||  || — || September 22, 2003 || Socorro || LINEAR || TIR || align=right | 5.6 km || 
|-id=792 bgcolor=#d6d6d6
| 267792 ||  || — || September 26, 2003 || Palomar || NEAT || — || align=right | 2.8 km || 
|-id=793 bgcolor=#d6d6d6
| 267793 ||  || — || September 28, 2003 || Desert Eagle || W. K. Y. Yeung || — || align=right | 4.4 km || 
|-id=794 bgcolor=#d6d6d6
| 267794 ||  || — || September 26, 2003 || Socorro || LINEAR || — || align=right | 4.6 km || 
|-id=795 bgcolor=#d6d6d6
| 267795 ||  || — || September 26, 2003 || Socorro || LINEAR || — || align=right | 6.1 km || 
|-id=796 bgcolor=#d6d6d6
| 267796 ||  || — || September 28, 2003 || Socorro || LINEAR || — || align=right | 3.4 km || 
|-id=797 bgcolor=#d6d6d6
| 267797 ||  || — || September 28, 2003 || Socorro || LINEAR || — || align=right | 4.8 km || 
|-id=798 bgcolor=#d6d6d6
| 267798 ||  || — || September 26, 2003 || Goodricke-Pigott || R. A. Tucker || — || align=right | 4.2 km || 
|-id=799 bgcolor=#d6d6d6
| 267799 ||  || — || September 29, 2003 || Socorro || LINEAR || THB || align=right | 4.8 km || 
|-id=800 bgcolor=#d6d6d6
| 267800 ||  || — || September 17, 2003 || Socorro || LINEAR || — || align=right | 4.5 km || 
|}

267801–267900 

|-bgcolor=#d6d6d6
| 267801 ||  || — || September 18, 2003 || Palomar || NEAT || — || align=right | 3.5 km || 
|-id=802 bgcolor=#d6d6d6
| 267802 ||  || — || September 19, 2003 || Palomar || NEAT || EOS || align=right | 3.6 km || 
|-id=803 bgcolor=#d6d6d6
| 267803 ||  || — || September 28, 2003 || Socorro || LINEAR || EOS || align=right | 2.2 km || 
|-id=804 bgcolor=#fefefe
| 267804 ||  || — || September 29, 2003 || Kitt Peak || Spacewatch || — || align=right data-sort-value="0.70" | 700 m || 
|-id=805 bgcolor=#d6d6d6
| 267805 ||  || — || September 16, 2003 || Kitt Peak || Spacewatch || — || align=right | 2.4 km || 
|-id=806 bgcolor=#d6d6d6
| 267806 ||  || — || September 28, 2003 || Anderson Mesa || LONEOS || EOS || align=right | 3.3 km || 
|-id=807 bgcolor=#d6d6d6
| 267807 ||  || — || September 17, 2003 || Kitt Peak || Spacewatch || — || align=right | 2.7 km || 
|-id=808 bgcolor=#d6d6d6
| 267808 ||  || — || September 28, 2003 || Anderson Mesa || LONEOS || — || align=right | 3.9 km || 
|-id=809 bgcolor=#d6d6d6
| 267809 ||  || — || September 22, 2003 || Kitt Peak || Spacewatch || — || align=right | 3.6 km || 
|-id=810 bgcolor=#d6d6d6
| 267810 ||  || — || October 15, 2003 || Anderson Mesa || LONEOS || URS || align=right | 4.7 km || 
|-id=811 bgcolor=#d6d6d6
| 267811 ||  || — || October 14, 2003 || Anderson Mesa || LONEOS || EOS || align=right | 3.3 km || 
|-id=812 bgcolor=#fefefe
| 267812 ||  || — || October 14, 2003 || Anderson Mesa || LONEOS || — || align=right data-sort-value="0.78" | 780 m || 
|-id=813 bgcolor=#d6d6d6
| 267813 ||  || — || October 5, 2003 || Kitt Peak || Spacewatch || EOS || align=right | 5.2 km || 
|-id=814 bgcolor=#d6d6d6
| 267814 ||  || — || October 1, 2003 || Kitt Peak || Spacewatch || HYG || align=right | 3.7 km || 
|-id=815 bgcolor=#d6d6d6
| 267815 ||  || — || October 5, 2003 || Kitt Peak || Spacewatch || EOS || align=right | 2.7 km || 
|-id=816 bgcolor=#d6d6d6
| 267816 ||  || — || October 16, 2003 || Kitt Peak || Spacewatch || EOS || align=right | 2.5 km || 
|-id=817 bgcolor=#d6d6d6
| 267817 ||  || — || October 16, 2003 || Anderson Mesa || LONEOS || — || align=right | 4.8 km || 
|-id=818 bgcolor=#d6d6d6
| 267818 ||  || — || October 16, 2003 || Anderson Mesa || LONEOS || THM || align=right | 3.3 km || 
|-id=819 bgcolor=#d6d6d6
| 267819 ||  || — || October 16, 2003 || Kitt Peak || Spacewatch || — || align=right | 4.1 km || 
|-id=820 bgcolor=#d6d6d6
| 267820 ||  || — || October 17, 2003 || Kitt Peak || Spacewatch || — || align=right | 5.1 km || 
|-id=821 bgcolor=#FA8072
| 267821 ||  || — || October 27, 2003 || Socorro || LINEAR || — || align=right data-sort-value="0.87" | 870 m || 
|-id=822 bgcolor=#d6d6d6
| 267822 ||  || — || October 16, 2003 || Anderson Mesa || LONEOS || 637 || align=right | 3.8 km || 
|-id=823 bgcolor=#d6d6d6
| 267823 ||  || — || October 20, 2003 || Goodricke-Pigott || R. A. Tucker || — || align=right | 4.2 km || 
|-id=824 bgcolor=#fefefe
| 267824 ||  || — || October 18, 2003 || Palomar || NEAT || — || align=right | 1.1 km || 
|-id=825 bgcolor=#d6d6d6
| 267825 ||  || — || October 16, 2003 || Palomar || NEAT || CHA || align=right | 3.5 km || 
|-id=826 bgcolor=#d6d6d6
| 267826 ||  || — || October 17, 2003 || Anderson Mesa || LONEOS || TEL || align=right | 2.1 km || 
|-id=827 bgcolor=#d6d6d6
| 267827 ||  || — || October 18, 2003 || Kitt Peak || Spacewatch || — || align=right | 4.4 km || 
|-id=828 bgcolor=#d6d6d6
| 267828 ||  || — || October 19, 2003 || Kitt Peak || Spacewatch || — || align=right | 3.6 km || 
|-id=829 bgcolor=#d6d6d6
| 267829 ||  || — || October 18, 2003 || Kitt Peak || Spacewatch || — || align=right | 4.5 km || 
|-id=830 bgcolor=#d6d6d6
| 267830 ||  || — || October 21, 2003 || Socorro || LINEAR || EOS || align=right | 3.2 km || 
|-id=831 bgcolor=#d6d6d6
| 267831 ||  || — || October 18, 2003 || Kitt Peak || Spacewatch || — || align=right | 4.6 km || 
|-id=832 bgcolor=#d6d6d6
| 267832 ||  || — || October 21, 2003 || Kitt Peak || Spacewatch || EOS || align=right | 6.3 km || 
|-id=833 bgcolor=#d6d6d6
| 267833 ||  || — || October 20, 2003 || Socorro || LINEAR || LIX || align=right | 4.8 km || 
|-id=834 bgcolor=#d6d6d6
| 267834 ||  || — || October 21, 2003 || Anderson Mesa || LONEOS || THM || align=right | 2.8 km || 
|-id=835 bgcolor=#E9E9E9
| 267835 ||  || — || October 16, 2003 || Anderson Mesa || LONEOS || — || align=right | 3.7 km || 
|-id=836 bgcolor=#d6d6d6
| 267836 ||  || — || October 18, 2003 || Palomar || NEAT || HYG || align=right | 3.3 km || 
|-id=837 bgcolor=#fefefe
| 267837 ||  || — || October 21, 2003 || Kitt Peak || Spacewatch || — || align=right data-sort-value="0.72" | 720 m || 
|-id=838 bgcolor=#d6d6d6
| 267838 ||  || — || October 21, 2003 || Kitt Peak || Spacewatch || — || align=right | 4.1 km || 
|-id=839 bgcolor=#d6d6d6
| 267839 ||  || — || October 21, 2003 || Kitt Peak || Spacewatch || — || align=right | 3.7 km || 
|-id=840 bgcolor=#E9E9E9
| 267840 ||  || — || October 21, 2003 || Anderson Mesa || LONEOS || WIT || align=right | 1.5 km || 
|-id=841 bgcolor=#d6d6d6
| 267841 ||  || — || October 22, 2003 || Kitt Peak || Spacewatch || HYG || align=right | 3.2 km || 
|-id=842 bgcolor=#fefefe
| 267842 ||  || — || October 23, 2003 || Kitt Peak || Spacewatch || — || align=right | 1.0 km || 
|-id=843 bgcolor=#fefefe
| 267843 ||  || — || October 21, 2003 || Anderson Mesa || LONEOS || — || align=right data-sort-value="0.82" | 820 m || 
|-id=844 bgcolor=#d6d6d6
| 267844 ||  || — || October 22, 2003 || Kitt Peak || Spacewatch || ALA || align=right | 5.2 km || 
|-id=845 bgcolor=#d6d6d6
| 267845 ||  || — || October 22, 2003 || Kitt Peak || Spacewatch || — || align=right | 4.1 km || 
|-id=846 bgcolor=#d6d6d6
| 267846 ||  || — || October 23, 2003 || Kitt Peak || Spacewatch || — || align=right | 4.5 km || 
|-id=847 bgcolor=#d6d6d6
| 267847 ||  || — || October 22, 2003 || Kitt Peak || Spacewatch || MEL || align=right | 4.3 km || 
|-id=848 bgcolor=#d6d6d6
| 267848 ||  || — || October 25, 2003 || Socorro || LINEAR || — || align=right | 3.9 km || 
|-id=849 bgcolor=#fefefe
| 267849 ||  || — || October 26, 2003 || Haleakala || NEAT || — || align=right data-sort-value="0.98" | 980 m || 
|-id=850 bgcolor=#d6d6d6
| 267850 ||  || — || October 25, 2003 || Socorro || LINEAR || — || align=right | 5.8 km || 
|-id=851 bgcolor=#E9E9E9
| 267851 ||  || — || October 29, 2003 || Anderson Mesa || LONEOS || ADE || align=right | 3.6 km || 
|-id=852 bgcolor=#fefefe
| 267852 ||  || — || October 30, 2003 || Kitt Peak || DLS || — || align=right data-sort-value="0.65" | 650 m || 
|-id=853 bgcolor=#d6d6d6
| 267853 ||  || — || October 30, 2003 || Socorro || LINEAR || LIX || align=right | 4.8 km || 
|-id=854 bgcolor=#d6d6d6
| 267854 ||  || — || October 16, 2003 || Palomar || NEAT || EOS || align=right | 3.8 km || 
|-id=855 bgcolor=#fefefe
| 267855 ||  || — || November 14, 2003 || Palomar || NEAT || — || align=right data-sort-value="0.82" | 820 m || 
|-id=856 bgcolor=#d6d6d6
| 267856 ||  || — || November 15, 2003 || Kitt Peak || Spacewatch || — || align=right | 5.7 km || 
|-id=857 bgcolor=#d6d6d6
| 267857 ||  || — || November 15, 2003 || Kitt Peak || Spacewatch || THM || align=right | 2.8 km || 
|-id=858 bgcolor=#d6d6d6
| 267858 ||  || — || November 18, 2003 || Palomar || NEAT || — || align=right | 3.9 km || 
|-id=859 bgcolor=#d6d6d6
| 267859 ||  || — || November 18, 2003 || Kitt Peak || Spacewatch || EOS || align=right | 3.1 km || 
|-id=860 bgcolor=#d6d6d6
| 267860 ||  || — || November 16, 2003 || Kitt Peak || Spacewatch || HYG || align=right | 2.9 km || 
|-id=861 bgcolor=#d6d6d6
| 267861 ||  || — || November 18, 2003 || Palomar || NEAT || URS || align=right | 5.8 km || 
|-id=862 bgcolor=#d6d6d6
| 267862 ||  || — || November 19, 2003 || Kitt Peak || Spacewatch || — || align=right | 3.6 km || 
|-id=863 bgcolor=#fefefe
| 267863 ||  || — || November 19, 2003 || Kitt Peak || Spacewatch || — || align=right data-sort-value="0.74" | 740 m || 
|-id=864 bgcolor=#d6d6d6
| 267864 ||  || — || November 20, 2003 || Socorro || LINEAR || — || align=right | 4.0 km || 
|-id=865 bgcolor=#d6d6d6
| 267865 ||  || — || November 19, 2003 || Socorro || LINEAR || EOS || align=right | 3.5 km || 
|-id=866 bgcolor=#d6d6d6
| 267866 ||  || — || November 21, 2003 || Socorro || LINEAR || ALA || align=right | 5.9 km || 
|-id=867 bgcolor=#fefefe
| 267867 ||  || — || November 20, 2003 || Socorro || LINEAR || — || align=right data-sort-value="0.99" | 990 m || 
|-id=868 bgcolor=#d6d6d6
| 267868 ||  || — || November 20, 2003 || Socorro || LINEAR || VER || align=right | 4.2 km || 
|-id=869 bgcolor=#d6d6d6
| 267869 ||  || — || November 20, 2003 || Socorro || LINEAR || — || align=right | 4.9 km || 
|-id=870 bgcolor=#fefefe
| 267870 ||  || — || November 23, 2003 || Kitt Peak || Spacewatch || FLO || align=right data-sort-value="0.89" | 890 m || 
|-id=871 bgcolor=#FA8072
| 267871 ||  || — || November 26, 2003 || Socorro || LINEAR || PHO || align=right | 1.5 km || 
|-id=872 bgcolor=#d6d6d6
| 267872 ||  || — || November 29, 2003 || Kingsnake || J. V. McClusky || THB || align=right | 5.0 km || 
|-id=873 bgcolor=#d6d6d6
| 267873 ||  || — || November 30, 2003 || Kitt Peak || Spacewatch || — || align=right | 4.4 km || 
|-id=874 bgcolor=#fefefe
| 267874 ||  || — || November 30, 2003 || Kitt Peak || Spacewatch || — || align=right data-sort-value="0.78" | 780 m || 
|-id=875 bgcolor=#d6d6d6
| 267875 ||  || — || November 19, 2003 || Palomar || NEAT || — || align=right | 5.3 km || 
|-id=876 bgcolor=#d6d6d6
| 267876 ||  || — || December 1, 2003 || Kitt Peak || Spacewatch || — || align=right | 3.5 km || 
|-id=877 bgcolor=#d6d6d6
| 267877 ||  || — || December 1, 2003 || Kitt Peak || Spacewatch || — || align=right | 3.0 km || 
|-id=878 bgcolor=#FA8072
| 267878 ||  || — || December 16, 2003 || Anderson Mesa || LONEOS || — || align=right | 1.8 km || 
|-id=879 bgcolor=#fefefe
| 267879 ||  || — || December 17, 2003 || Palomar || NEAT || — || align=right | 1.1 km || 
|-id=880 bgcolor=#fefefe
| 267880 ||  || — || December 18, 2003 || Socorro || LINEAR || — || align=right data-sort-value="0.85" | 850 m || 
|-id=881 bgcolor=#fefefe
| 267881 ||  || — || December 18, 2003 || Socorro || LINEAR || — || align=right data-sort-value="0.98" | 980 m || 
|-id=882 bgcolor=#fefefe
| 267882 ||  || — || December 19, 2003 || Kitt Peak || Spacewatch || FLO || align=right data-sort-value="0.83" | 830 m || 
|-id=883 bgcolor=#fefefe
| 267883 ||  || — || December 19, 2003 || Socorro || LINEAR || — || align=right | 1.2 km || 
|-id=884 bgcolor=#fefefe
| 267884 ||  || — || December 20, 2003 || Socorro || LINEAR || PHO || align=right | 1.3 km || 
|-id=885 bgcolor=#fefefe
| 267885 ||  || — || December 18, 2003 || Socorro || LINEAR || — || align=right | 1.1 km || 
|-id=886 bgcolor=#fefefe
| 267886 ||  || — || December 18, 2003 || Socorro || LINEAR || — || align=right data-sort-value="0.95" | 950 m || 
|-id=887 bgcolor=#fefefe
| 267887 ||  || — || December 21, 2003 || Socorro || LINEAR || — || align=right | 1.0 km || 
|-id=888 bgcolor=#d6d6d6
| 267888 ||  || — || December 23, 2003 || Socorro || LINEAR || HYG || align=right | 3.6 km || 
|-id=889 bgcolor=#fefefe
| 267889 ||  || — || December 28, 2003 || Kitt Peak || Spacewatch || — || align=right data-sort-value="0.91" | 910 m || 
|-id=890 bgcolor=#fefefe
| 267890 ||  || — || December 27, 2003 || Kitt Peak || Spacewatch || — || align=right data-sort-value="0.94" | 940 m || 
|-id=891 bgcolor=#d6d6d6
| 267891 ||  || — || December 17, 2003 || Socorro || LINEAR || EOS || align=right | 3.7 km || 
|-id=892 bgcolor=#fefefe
| 267892 ||  || — || December 19, 2003 || Socorro || LINEAR || FLO || align=right data-sort-value="0.80" | 800 m || 
|-id=893 bgcolor=#fefefe
| 267893 ||  || — || December 18, 2003 || Socorro || LINEAR || — || align=right | 1.0 km || 
|-id=894 bgcolor=#fefefe
| 267894 ||  || — || January 16, 2004 || Palomar || NEAT || FLO || align=right data-sort-value="0.94" | 940 m || 
|-id=895 bgcolor=#fefefe
| 267895 ||  || — || January 16, 2004 || Palomar || NEAT || — || align=right data-sort-value="0.77" | 770 m || 
|-id=896 bgcolor=#fefefe
| 267896 ||  || — || January 21, 2004 || Socorro || LINEAR || — || align=right data-sort-value="0.72" | 720 m || 
|-id=897 bgcolor=#fefefe
| 267897 ||  || — || January 21, 2004 || Socorro || LINEAR || — || align=right data-sort-value="0.89" | 890 m || 
|-id=898 bgcolor=#fefefe
| 267898 ||  || — || January 22, 2004 || Palomar || NEAT || — || align=right data-sort-value="0.79" | 790 m || 
|-id=899 bgcolor=#fefefe
| 267899 ||  || — || January 21, 2004 || Kitt Peak || Spacewatch || FLO || align=right data-sort-value="0.87" | 870 m || 
|-id=900 bgcolor=#fefefe
| 267900 ||  || — || January 27, 2004 || Kitt Peak || Spacewatch || V || align=right data-sort-value="0.85" | 850 m || 
|}

267901–268000 

|-bgcolor=#fefefe
| 267901 ||  || — || January 27, 2004 || Socorro || LINEAR || — || align=right | 1.1 km || 
|-id=902 bgcolor=#fefefe
| 267902 ||  || — || January 28, 2004 || Catalina || CSS || — || align=right | 1.2 km || 
|-id=903 bgcolor=#fefefe
| 267903 ||  || — || January 28, 2004 || Kitt Peak || Spacewatch || V || align=right data-sort-value="0.87" | 870 m || 
|-id=904 bgcolor=#fefefe
| 267904 ||  || — || January 29, 2004 || Socorro || LINEAR || — || align=right | 1.6 km || 
|-id=905 bgcolor=#fefefe
| 267905 ||  || — || January 19, 2004 || Kitt Peak || Spacewatch || FLO || align=right data-sort-value="0.82" | 820 m || 
|-id=906 bgcolor=#fefefe
| 267906 ||  || — || January 28, 2004 || Kitt Peak || Spacewatch || — || align=right data-sort-value="0.78" | 780 m || 
|-id=907 bgcolor=#fefefe
| 267907 ||  || — || February 10, 2004 || Palomar || NEAT || FLO || align=right | 1.0 km || 
|-id=908 bgcolor=#fefefe
| 267908 ||  || — || February 11, 2004 || Anderson Mesa || LONEOS || — || align=right data-sort-value="0.67" | 670 m || 
|-id=909 bgcolor=#fefefe
| 267909 ||  || — || February 12, 2004 || Kitt Peak || Spacewatch || — || align=right | 1.1 km || 
|-id=910 bgcolor=#fefefe
| 267910 ||  || — || February 12, 2004 || Kitt Peak || Spacewatch || — || align=right data-sort-value="0.93" | 930 m || 
|-id=911 bgcolor=#fefefe
| 267911 ||  || — || February 11, 2004 || Kitt Peak || Spacewatch || FLO || align=right data-sort-value="0.71" | 710 m || 
|-id=912 bgcolor=#fefefe
| 267912 ||  || — || February 10, 2004 || Palomar || NEAT || — || align=right | 1.2 km || 
|-id=913 bgcolor=#fefefe
| 267913 ||  || — || February 13, 2004 || Kitt Peak || Spacewatch || — || align=right data-sort-value="0.90" | 900 m || 
|-id=914 bgcolor=#fefefe
| 267914 ||  || — || February 14, 2004 || Haleakala || NEAT || FLO || align=right data-sort-value="0.87" | 870 m || 
|-id=915 bgcolor=#fefefe
| 267915 ||  || — || February 11, 2004 || Palomar || NEAT || — || align=right | 1.1 km || 
|-id=916 bgcolor=#fefefe
| 267916 ||  || — || February 13, 2004 || Kitt Peak || Spacewatch || EUT || align=right data-sort-value="0.80" | 800 m || 
|-id=917 bgcolor=#fefefe
| 267917 ||  || — || February 15, 2004 || Catalina || CSS || — || align=right | 1.1 km || 
|-id=918 bgcolor=#fefefe
| 267918 ||  || — || February 14, 2004 || Kitt Peak || Spacewatch || ERI || align=right | 2.0 km || 
|-id=919 bgcolor=#fefefe
| 267919 ||  || — || February 11, 2004 || Palomar || NEAT || FLO || align=right data-sort-value="0.87" | 870 m || 
|-id=920 bgcolor=#fefefe
| 267920 ||  || — || February 12, 2004 || Kitt Peak || Spacewatch || — || align=right data-sort-value="0.67" | 670 m || 
|-id=921 bgcolor=#fefefe
| 267921 ||  || — || February 16, 2004 || Kitt Peak || Spacewatch || V || align=right | 1.0 km || 
|-id=922 bgcolor=#fefefe
| 267922 ||  || — || February 16, 2004 || Kitt Peak || Spacewatch || — || align=right | 1.2 km || 
|-id=923 bgcolor=#fefefe
| 267923 ||  || — || February 18, 2004 || Socorro || LINEAR || FLO || align=right data-sort-value="0.94" | 940 m || 
|-id=924 bgcolor=#fefefe
| 267924 ||  || — || February 17, 2004 || Socorro || LINEAR || FLO || align=right data-sort-value="0.95" | 950 m || 
|-id=925 bgcolor=#fefefe
| 267925 ||  || — || February 16, 2004 || Kitt Peak || Spacewatch || V || align=right | 1.0 km || 
|-id=926 bgcolor=#fefefe
| 267926 ||  || — || February 18, 2004 || Socorro || LINEAR || — || align=right | 1.1 km || 
|-id=927 bgcolor=#fefefe
| 267927 ||  || — || February 19, 2004 || Socorro || LINEAR || PHO || align=right | 1.6 km || 
|-id=928 bgcolor=#fefefe
| 267928 ||  || — || February 17, 2004 || Kitt Peak || Spacewatch || V || align=right data-sort-value="0.82" | 820 m || 
|-id=929 bgcolor=#fefefe
| 267929 ||  || — || February 23, 2004 || Socorro || LINEAR || FLO || align=right data-sort-value="0.75" | 750 m || 
|-id=930 bgcolor=#fefefe
| 267930 ||  || — || February 16, 2004 || Socorro || LINEAR || V || align=right data-sort-value="0.93" | 930 m || 
|-id=931 bgcolor=#fefefe
| 267931 ||  || — || February 19, 2004 || Socorro || LINEAR || V || align=right data-sort-value="0.87" | 870 m || 
|-id=932 bgcolor=#fefefe
| 267932 ||  || — || February 23, 2004 || Socorro || LINEAR || — || align=right | 1.3 km || 
|-id=933 bgcolor=#fefefe
| 267933 ||  || — || February 23, 2004 || Socorro || LINEAR || NYS || align=right data-sort-value="0.91" | 910 m || 
|-id=934 bgcolor=#fefefe
| 267934 ||  || — || February 29, 2004 || Kitt Peak || Spacewatch || — || align=right | 1.2 km || 
|-id=935 bgcolor=#fefefe
| 267935 ||  || — || March 11, 2004 || Palomar || NEAT || PHO || align=right | 1.4 km || 
|-id=936 bgcolor=#fefefe
| 267936 ||  || — || March 14, 2004 || Palomar || NEAT || ERI || align=right | 2.7 km || 
|-id=937 bgcolor=#fefefe
| 267937 ||  || — || March 13, 2004 || Palomar || NEAT || FLO || align=right data-sort-value="0.89" | 890 m || 
|-id=938 bgcolor=#fefefe
| 267938 ||  || — || March 14, 2004 || Kitt Peak || Spacewatch || EUT || align=right data-sort-value="0.93" | 930 m || 
|-id=939 bgcolor=#fefefe
| 267939 ||  || — || March 14, 2004 || Catalina || CSS || V || align=right data-sort-value="0.75" | 750 m || 
|-id=940 bgcolor=#FFC2E0
| 267940 ||  || — || March 15, 2004 || Socorro || LINEAR || APO || align=right data-sort-value="0.31" | 310 m || 
|-id=941 bgcolor=#fefefe
| 267941 ||  || — || March 15, 2004 || Campo Imperatore || CINEOS || V || align=right data-sort-value="0.89" | 890 m || 
|-id=942 bgcolor=#fefefe
| 267942 ||  || — || March 15, 2004 || Socorro || LINEAR || — || align=right | 1.3 km || 
|-id=943 bgcolor=#fefefe
| 267943 ||  || — || March 12, 2004 || Palomar || NEAT || — || align=right | 1.5 km || 
|-id=944 bgcolor=#fefefe
| 267944 ||  || — || March 15, 2004 || Catalina || CSS || FLO || align=right | 1.1 km || 
|-id=945 bgcolor=#fefefe
| 267945 ||  || — || March 13, 2004 || Palomar || NEAT || — || align=right | 1.2 km || 
|-id=946 bgcolor=#d6d6d6
| 267946 ||  || — || March 15, 2004 || Palomar || NEAT || — || align=right | 5.1 km || 
|-id=947 bgcolor=#fefefe
| 267947 ||  || — || March 15, 2004 || Socorro || LINEAR || ERI || align=right | 2.0 km || 
|-id=948 bgcolor=#fefefe
| 267948 ||  || — || March 15, 2004 || Catalina || CSS || V || align=right | 1.1 km || 
|-id=949 bgcolor=#d6d6d6
| 267949 ||  || — || March 15, 2004 || Catalina || CSS || — || align=right | 3.5 km || 
|-id=950 bgcolor=#fefefe
| 267950 ||  || — || March 14, 2004 || Socorro || LINEAR || FLO || align=right | 1.1 km || 
|-id=951 bgcolor=#fefefe
| 267951 ||  || — || March 14, 2004 || Kitt Peak || Spacewatch || MAS || align=right data-sort-value="0.83" | 830 m || 
|-id=952 bgcolor=#fefefe
| 267952 ||  || — || March 15, 2004 || Socorro || LINEAR || — || align=right | 1.7 km || 
|-id=953 bgcolor=#fefefe
| 267953 ||  || — || March 15, 2004 || Socorro || LINEAR || V || align=right data-sort-value="0.97" | 970 m || 
|-id=954 bgcolor=#fefefe
| 267954 ||  || — || March 15, 2004 || Kitt Peak || Spacewatch || — || align=right data-sort-value="0.87" | 870 m || 
|-id=955 bgcolor=#fefefe
| 267955 ||  || — || March 16, 2004 || Catalina || CSS || V || align=right data-sort-value="0.93" | 930 m || 
|-id=956 bgcolor=#fefefe
| 267956 ||  || — || March 16, 2004 || Catalina || CSS || V || align=right data-sort-value="0.98" | 980 m || 
|-id=957 bgcolor=#fefefe
| 267957 ||  || — || March 17, 2004 || Kitt Peak || Spacewatch || MAS || align=right data-sort-value="0.78" | 780 m || 
|-id=958 bgcolor=#fefefe
| 267958 ||  || — || March 24, 2004 || Siding Spring || SSS || PHO || align=right | 1.1 km || 
|-id=959 bgcolor=#fefefe
| 267959 ||  || — || March 16, 2004 || Socorro || LINEAR || NYS || align=right data-sort-value="0.86" | 860 m || 
|-id=960 bgcolor=#fefefe
| 267960 ||  || — || March 16, 2004 || Kitt Peak || Spacewatch || — || align=right | 1.5 km || 
|-id=961 bgcolor=#fefefe
| 267961 ||  || — || March 17, 2004 || Kitt Peak || Spacewatch || — || align=right | 1.0 km || 
|-id=962 bgcolor=#fefefe
| 267962 ||  || — || March 17, 2004 || Socorro || LINEAR || PHO || align=right | 1.6 km || 
|-id=963 bgcolor=#fefefe
| 267963 ||  || — || March 16, 2004 || Socorro || LINEAR || NYS || align=right | 1.1 km || 
|-id=964 bgcolor=#fefefe
| 267964 ||  || — || March 19, 2004 || Socorro || LINEAR || — || align=right | 1.2 km || 
|-id=965 bgcolor=#fefefe
| 267965 ||  || — || March 20, 2004 || Socorro || LINEAR || — || align=right data-sort-value="0.79" | 790 m || 
|-id=966 bgcolor=#fefefe
| 267966 ||  || — || March 17, 2004 || Kitt Peak || Spacewatch || FLO || align=right data-sort-value="0.76" | 760 m || 
|-id=967 bgcolor=#fefefe
| 267967 ||  || — || March 19, 2004 || Palomar || NEAT || — || align=right | 1.2 km || 
|-id=968 bgcolor=#fefefe
| 267968 ||  || — || March 22, 2004 || Socorro || LINEAR || NYS || align=right data-sort-value="0.90" | 900 m || 
|-id=969 bgcolor=#fefefe
| 267969 ||  || — || March 23, 2004 || Socorro || LINEAR || V || align=right | 1.0 km || 
|-id=970 bgcolor=#fefefe
| 267970 ||  || — || March 23, 2004 || Socorro || LINEAR || — || align=right | 1.6 km || 
|-id=971 bgcolor=#fefefe
| 267971 ||  || — || March 24, 2004 || Anderson Mesa || LONEOS || — || align=right data-sort-value="0.95" | 950 m || 
|-id=972 bgcolor=#fefefe
| 267972 ||  || — || March 24, 2004 || Anderson Mesa || LONEOS || — || align=right data-sort-value="0.97" | 970 m || 
|-id=973 bgcolor=#fefefe
| 267973 ||  || — || March 23, 2004 || Socorro || LINEAR || — || align=right | 1.0 km || 
|-id=974 bgcolor=#fefefe
| 267974 ||  || — || March 23, 2004 || Socorro || LINEAR || — || align=right | 1.3 km || 
|-id=975 bgcolor=#fefefe
| 267975 ||  || — || March 26, 2004 || Kitt Peak || Spacewatch || MAS || align=right | 1.00 km || 
|-id=976 bgcolor=#fefefe
| 267976 ||  || — || March 27, 2004 || Socorro || LINEAR || NYS || align=right data-sort-value="0.74" | 740 m || 
|-id=977 bgcolor=#fefefe
| 267977 ||  || — || March 30, 2004 || Junk Bond || Junk Bond Obs. || FLO || align=right data-sort-value="0.98" | 980 m || 
|-id=978 bgcolor=#fefefe
| 267978 ||  || — || March 16, 2004 || Valmeca || C. Demeautis, D. Matter || — || align=right data-sort-value="0.90" | 900 m || 
|-id=979 bgcolor=#fefefe
| 267979 ||  || — || April 9, 2004 || Siding Spring || SSS || — || align=right | 1.9 km || 
|-id=980 bgcolor=#fefefe
| 267980 ||  || — || April 11, 2004 || Palomar || NEAT || — || align=right | 1.0 km || 
|-id=981 bgcolor=#fefefe
| 267981 ||  || — || April 11, 2004 || Palomar || NEAT || — || align=right | 1.1 km || 
|-id=982 bgcolor=#fefefe
| 267982 ||  || — || April 11, 2004 || Palomar || NEAT || — || align=right | 1.4 km || 
|-id=983 bgcolor=#fefefe
| 267983 ||  || — || April 15, 2004 || Desert Eagle || W. K. Y. Yeung || NYS || align=right data-sort-value="0.89" | 890 m || 
|-id=984 bgcolor=#fefefe
| 267984 ||  || — || April 9, 2004 || Siding Spring || SSS || — || align=right | 1.1 km || 
|-id=985 bgcolor=#fefefe
| 267985 ||  || — || April 14, 2004 || Kitt Peak || Spacewatch || — || align=right data-sort-value="0.84" | 840 m || 
|-id=986 bgcolor=#fefefe
| 267986 ||  || — || April 13, 2004 || Kitt Peak || Spacewatch || — || align=right data-sort-value="0.91" | 910 m || 
|-id=987 bgcolor=#fefefe
| 267987 ||  || — || April 13, 2004 || Kitt Peak || Spacewatch || NYS || align=right data-sort-value="0.65" | 650 m || 
|-id=988 bgcolor=#fefefe
| 267988 ||  || — || April 15, 2004 || Anderson Mesa || LONEOS || — || align=right | 1.4 km || 
|-id=989 bgcolor=#fefefe
| 267989 ||  || — || April 15, 2004 || Anderson Mesa || LONEOS || NYS || align=right data-sort-value="0.79" | 790 m || 
|-id=990 bgcolor=#fefefe
| 267990 ||  || — || April 13, 2004 || Kitt Peak || Spacewatch || V || align=right data-sort-value="0.87" | 870 m || 
|-id=991 bgcolor=#fefefe
| 267991 ||  || — || April 15, 2004 || Palomar || NEAT || FLO || align=right data-sort-value="0.93" | 930 m || 
|-id=992 bgcolor=#fefefe
| 267992 ||  || — || April 11, 2004 || Palomar || NEAT || MAS || align=right | 1.0 km || 
|-id=993 bgcolor=#fefefe
| 267993 ||  || — || April 13, 2004 || Palomar || NEAT || MAS || align=right data-sort-value="0.79" | 790 m || 
|-id=994 bgcolor=#fefefe
| 267994 ||  || — || April 19, 2004 || Socorro || LINEAR || V || align=right data-sort-value="0.90" | 900 m || 
|-id=995 bgcolor=#fefefe
| 267995 ||  || — || April 19, 2004 || Socorro || LINEAR || — || align=right | 1.0 km || 
|-id=996 bgcolor=#fefefe
| 267996 ||  || — || April 20, 2004 || Socorro || LINEAR || — || align=right | 1.2 km || 
|-id=997 bgcolor=#fefefe
| 267997 ||  || — || April 20, 2004 || Socorro || LINEAR || ERI || align=right | 1.8 km || 
|-id=998 bgcolor=#fefefe
| 267998 ||  || — || April 20, 2004 || Socorro || LINEAR || — || align=right | 1.3 km || 
|-id=999 bgcolor=#fefefe
| 267999 ||  || — || April 28, 2004 || Kitt Peak || Spacewatch || MAS || align=right data-sort-value="0.67" | 670 m || 
|-id=000 bgcolor=#fefefe
| 268000 ||  || — || May 9, 2004 || Palomar || NEAT || — || align=right data-sort-value="0.86" | 860 m || 
|}

References

External links 
 Discovery Circumstances: Numbered Minor Planets (265001)–(270000) (IAU Minor Planet Center)

0267